= WHO-convened Global Study of Origins of SARS-CoV-2 =

Collaborative study on the origin of the COVID-19 virus

The WHO-convened Global Study of Origins of SARS-CoV-2 or the Joint WHO-China Study was a collaborative study between the World Health Organization and the Government of China on the origins of COVID-19. The study was commissioned by the Director-General of the World Health Organization following a request by the 2020 World Health Assembly in which 122 WHO members proposed a motion, which included a call for a "comprehensive, independent and impartial" study into the COVID-19 pandemic" The WHO disbanded the team and proposed a new panel called Scientific Advisory Group for Origins of Novel Pathogens.

== Background ==
The World Health Organization has declared that finding where SARS-CoV-2 came from is a priority and that it is "essential for understanding how the pandemic started". In May 2020, the World Health Assembly, which governs the World Health Organization (WHO), passed a motion calling for a "comprehensive, independent and impartial" study into the COVID-19 pandemic. A record 137 countries, including China, co-sponsored the motion, giving overwhelming international endorsement to the study. In mid 2020, the World Health Organization (WHO) began negotiations with the government of China on conducting an official study into the origins of COVID-19.

In November 2020, the WHO published a two-phase study plan. The purpose of the first phase was to better understand how the virus "might have started circulating in Wuhan", and a second phase involves longer-term studies based on the findings of the first phase. WHO director-general Tedros Adhanom said "We need to know the origin of this virus because it can help us to prevent future outbreaks," adding, "There is nothing to hide. We want to know the origin, and that's it." He also urged countries not to politicise the origin tracing process, saying that would only create barriers to learning the truth.

== Phase 1 ==
For the first phase, the WHO formed a team of ten researchers with expertise in virology, public health and animals to conduct a thorough study. One of the team's tasks was to retrospectively ascertain what wildlife was being sold in local wet markets in Wuhan. The WHO's phase one team arrived and quarantined in Wuhan, Hubei, China in January 2021.

Members of the team included Thea Fisher, John Watson, Marion Koopmans, Dominic Dwyer, Vladimir Dedkov, Hung Nguyen-Viet, Fabian Leendertz, Peter Daszak, Farag El Moubasher, and Ken Maeda. The team also included five WHO experts led by Peter Ben Embarek, two Food and Agriculture Organization representatives, and two representatives from the World Organisation for Animal Health.

The inclusion of Peter Daszak in the team stirred controversy. Daszak is the head of EcoHealth Alliance, a nonprofit that studies spillover events, and has been a longtime collaborator of over 15 years with Shi Zhengli, Wuhan Institute of Virology's director of the Center for Emerging Infectious Diseases. While Daszak is highly knowledgeable about Chinese laboratories and the emergence of diseases in the area, his close connection with the WIV was seen by some as a conflict of interest in the WHO's study. When a BBC News journalist asked about his relationship with the WIV, Daszak said, "We file our papers, it's all there for everyone to see."

== Findings ==
In February 2021, after conducting part of their study, the WHO stated that the likely origin of COVID-19 was a zoonotic event from a virus circulating in bats, likely through another animal carrier, and that the time of transmission to humans was likely towards the end of 2019.

The Chinese and the international experts who jointly carried out the WHO-convened study consider it "extremely unlikely" that COVID-19 leaked from a lab. No evidence of a lab leak from the Wuhan Institute of Virology was found by the WHO team, with team leader Peter Ben Embarek stating that it was "very unlikely" due to the safety protocols in place. During a 60 Minutes interview with Lesley Stahl, Peter Daszak, a member of the WHO team, described the investigation process to be a series of questions and answers between the WHO team and the Wuhan lab staff. Stahl made the comment that the team was "just taking their word for it", to which Daszak replied, "Well, what else can we do? There's a limit to what you can do and we went right up to that limit. We asked them tough questions. They weren't vetted in advance. And the answers they gave, we found to be believable—correct and convincing."

The investigation also stated that transfer from animals to humans was unlikely to have occurred at the Huanan Seafood Market, since infections without a known epidemiological link were confirmed before the outbreak around the market. In an announcement that surprised some foreign experts, the joint investigation concluded that early transmission via the cold chain of frozen products was "possible".

In March 2021, the WHO published a written report with the results of the study. The joint team stated that there are four scenarios for introduction:

- direct zoonotic transmission to humans (spillover), assessed as "possible to likely"
- introduction through an intermediate host followed by a spillover, assessed as "likely to very likely"
- introduction through the (cold) food chain, assessed as "possible"
- introduction through a laboratory incident, assessed as "extremely unlikely"

The report mentions that direct zoonotic transmission to humans has a precedent, as most current human coronaviruses originated in animals. Zoonotic transmission is also supported by the fact that RaTG13 binds to hACE2, although the fit is not optimal.

The investigative team noted the requirement for further studies, noting that these would "potentially increase knowledge and understanding globally."

== Reception ==
WHO director-general Tedros Adhanom, who was not directly involved with the investigation, said he was ready to dispatch additional missions involving specialist experts and that further research was required. He said in a statement, "Some explanations may be more probable than others, but for now all possibilities remain on the table". He also said, "We have not yet found the source of the virus, and we must continue to follow the science and leave no stone unturned as we do." Tedros also called on China to provide "more timely and comprehensive data sharing" as part of future investigations.

News outlets noted that though it was unrealistic to expect quick and huge results from the report, it "offered few clear-cut conclusions regarding the start of the pandemic", "failed to audit the Chinese official position at some parts of the report", and was "biased according to critics". Other scientists praised how the report details the pathways that can shed light on the origin, if explored later.

After the publication of the report, politicians, talk show hosts, journalists, and some scientists advanced unsupported claims that SARS-CoV-2 may have come from the WIV. In the United States, calls to investigate a laboratory leak reached a "fever pitch", fueling aggressive rhetoric resulting in antipathy towards people of Asian ancestry, and the bullying of scientists. The United States, European Union, and 13 other countries criticised the WHO-convened study, calling for transparency from China and access to the raw data and original samples. Chinese officials described these criticisms as an attempt to politicise the study. Scientists involved in the WHO report, including Liang Wannian, John Watson, and Peter Daszak, objected to the criticism, and said that the report was an example of the collaboration and dialogue required to successfully continue investigations into the matter.

In a letter published in Science, a number of scientists, including Ralph Baric, argued that the accidental laboratory leak hypothesis had not been sufficiently investigated and remained possible, calling for greater clarity and additional data. Their letter was criticized by some virologists and public health experts, who said that a "hostile" and "divisive" focus on the WIV was unsupported by evidence, and would cause Chinese scientists and authorities to share less, rather than more data.

== Phase 2 ==
On 27 May 2021, Danish epidemiologist Tina Fischer spoke on the This Week in Virology podcast, advocating for a second phase of the study to audit blood samples for COVID-19 antibodies in China. WHO-convened study team member Marion Koopmans, on that same broadcast, advocated for WHO member states to make a decision on the second phase of the study, though she also cautioned that an investigatory audit of the laboratory itself may be inconclusive. In early July 2021, WHO emergency chief Michael Ryan said the final details of phase 2 were being worked out in negotiations between WHO and its member states, as the WHO works "by persuasion" and cannot compel any member state (including China) to cooperate.

In July 2021 China rejected WHO requests for greater transparency, cooperation, and access to data as part of Phase 2. On 16 July 2021, Foreign Ministry spokesperson Zhao Lijian declared that China's position was that future investigations should be conducted elsewhere and should focus on cold chain transmission and the US military's labs. On 22 July 2021, the Chinese government held a press conference in which Zeng Yixin, Vice Health Minister of the National Health Commission (NHC), said that China would not participate in a second phase of the WHO's investigation, denouncing it as "shocking" and "arrogant". He elaborated "In some aspects, the WHO's plan for next phase of investigation of the coronavirus origin doesn't respect common sense, and it's against science. It's impossible for us to accept such a plan."

== See also ==
- Investigations into the origin of COVID-19
- Scientific Advisory Group for Origins of Novel Pathogens
- World Health Organization's response to the COVID-19 pandemic
