= Lancet letter (COVID-19) =

Controversial letter on COVID-19 origins

The Lancet letter (also referred to as Calisher et al. 2020) was a statement made in support of scientists and medical professionals in China fighting the outbreak of COVID-19, and condemning theories suggesting that the virus does not have a natural origin, which it referred to as "conspiracy theories". The letter was published in The Lancet on February 19, 2020, and signed by 27 prominent scientists, gaining a further 20,000 signatures in a Change.org petition. The letter generated significant controversy over the allegations of conflicts of interest of its authors, most notably Peter Daszak's undisclosed relationship with the Wuhan Institute of Virology, and the chilling effect it had on scientists proposing that the COVID-19 lab leak theory be investigated.

== Background ==
From the early outbreak of the COVID-19 pandemic, rumors and speculation arose about the possible lab origins of SARS-CoV-2, the causative agent of the COVID-19 disease. Different versions of the lab origin hypothesis present different scenarios in which a bat-borne progenitor of SARS-COV-2 may have spilled over to humans, including a laboratory-acquired infection of a natural or engineered virus. Some early rumors focused on the deliberate leak of a virus as a bioweapon or accidental leak of an engineered virus. Some signatories of the Lancet letter, such as Stanley Perlman and Linda Saif, said they were focused on dispelling these rumours, though the letter did not make this distinguishment, as Daszak insisted on a "broad statement".

== Reception ==
=== Critical commentary ===
According to journalist Paul Thacker, the Lancet letter "helped to guide almost a year of reporting, as journalists helped to amplify Daszak's message and to silence scientific and public debate." This affected reporting on the origins of the virus, "characterising the lab leak theory as unworthy of serious consideration".

In an interview with The Wall Street Journal, social scientist Filippa Lentzos said that the letter's conclusion was premature, saying that some scientists "closed ranks", fearing for their careers and grants.

The letter was criticized by media commentator Jamie Metzl for "scientific propaganda and thuggery". Metzel wrote to Lancet editor Richard Horton to flag Daszak's conflict of interest, but received no response. Horton later responded in a UK parliament session. Horton said to the committee "We trust authors to be honest with us and authors trust us to deal with their work confidentially and appropriately. Sometimes that system breaks down, and in this particular case Peter Daszak should certainly have declared his competing interests right at the beginning."

Journalist Katherine Eban wrote in Vanity Fair that the letter had a "chilling effect" on scientific research and the scientific community by implying that scientists who "bring up the lab-leak theory ... are doing the work of conspiracy theorists". The letter was deemed to have "effectively ended the debate over COVID-19's origins before it began". Further criticism of the letter was focused on the fact that, according to emails obtained through FOIA, members involved in producing the letter concealed their involvement "to create the impression of scientific unanimity" and failed to disclose conflicts.

Nicholas Wade, a former New York Times science writer, wrote in the Bulletin of the Atomic Scientists that "Contrary to the letter writers' assertion, the idea that the virus might have escaped from a lab invoked accident, not conspiracy." Wade opined that the signatories of the Lancet letter behaved as "poor scientists" for "assuring the public of facts they could not know for sure were true."

Rutgers professor Richard Ebright noted that the conflicts of interest involving virologists denying that the pandemic could have come from a laboratory in Wuhan were "simply unprecedented."

According to Politico, Assistant Secretary of State for East Asian and Pacific Affairs David Stilwell was shocked by the letter and its complete dismissal the lab leak possibility, saying that it was apparent that "the science world was not playing above board."

In November 2020, David Relman published an opinion piece in Proceedings of the National Academy of Sciences of the United States of America, pointing out that "origin story" of the virus was still missing key details and that an objective analysis necessitated "addressing some uncomfortable possibilities," including an accidental release from a laboratory. When asked by UnDark why he thought Daszak and others pushed so strongly against the possibility of a lab leak, Relman said they may have wanted to "deflect perceptions of their work as endangering humankind".

=== Signatories' statements ===
According to The Wall Street Journal, three signatories' said that upon further reflection, they thought a laboratory accident was plausible enough to merit consideration. Bernard Roizman is reported to have said "I'm convinced that what happened is that the virus was brought to a lab, they started to work with it…and some sloppy individual brought it out".

In June 2021, ABC News reported Calisher had "completely changed his position", saying he believes that "there is too much coincidence" to ignore the lab-leak theory and that "it is more likely that it came out of that lab."

In an email to Undark Magazine, Stanley Perlman wrote that versions of the lab leak idea differed in whether they posited the virus was engineered in a lab before leaking, explaining that the Lancet letter focused more on engineering.

In an interview with the Süddeutsche Zeitung in February 2022, Christian Drosten said that had the experiments being done at the laboratory in Wuhan been disclosed by those involved, he would have "at least asked questions" before signing the letter.

== Lancet response ==
=== Addendum ===
Following criticisms from the public that Daszak had failed to disclose certain relationships, The Lancet published an addendum, saying "There may be differences in opinion as to what constitutes a competing interest." It also invited Daszak and other authors of the letter to amend their competing interest statements. Daszak amended his statement to describe the research he has done in southeast Asia, with various different institutions including the Wuhan Institute of Virology. Daszak also recused himself from The Lancet's COVID-19 origins inquiry.

=== Second letter ===
Following the addendum to the first letter, the authors of the first letter published a second letter, reaffirming their view that the pandemic has natural origins. William B. Karesh, Peter Palese, and Bernard Roizman, who signed the first letter, did not sign the second letter.

Stanley Perlman, who signed both letters, said the original letter addressed the lab leak bioengineering scenario only and that the second letter addresses the scenario where a natural virus was accidentally released.

== Counterstatements ==
=== Science Magazine ===
In May 2021, a group of 18 prominent scientists published a letter in Science Magazine saying "We must take hypotheses about both natural and laboratory spillovers seriously until we have sufficient data" and that "theories of accidental release from a lab and zoonotic spillover both remain viable." The letter also criticized the WHO report on covid origins for dismissing the lab-leak theory.

=== The Lancet ===
In September 2021, The Lancet published a letter from a group of 16 virologists, biologists, and biosecurity specialists saying that more evidence is needed before any definitive conclusions on the origins question and calling for further investigations into a lab leak. The letter stressed that "Research-related hypotheses are not misinformation or conjecture" and that "Scientific journals should open their columns to in-depth analyses of all hypotheses." The Times of India described The Lancet's decision to publish the letter as a "u-turn".

=== National Academy of Sciences ===
The US National Academy of Sciences said that the search should be "guided by scientific principles" that would consider multiple scenarios for the origin of the pandemic.

In an interview with The Washington Post, Marcia McNutt said scientists open to the possibility of a laboratory accident should not be labeled conspiracy theorists.

== See also ==
- Investigations into the origin of COVID-19
- COVID-19 lab leak theory
