= DRASTIC =

Twitter group investigating COVID-19 origins

DRASTIC (Decentralized Radical Autonomous Search Team Investigating COVID-19) is a loose collection of internet activists assembled to investigate the origins of COVID-19, in particular the lab leak theory. Composed of about 30 core members, and primarily organized through the social media website Twitter, DRASTIC was formed in February 2020, at the start of the COVID-19 pandemic. DRASTIC members called for a "full and unrestricted investigation" into the origins of COVID-19, conducted independently of the World Health Organization; most scientists thought that COVID-19 likely had a natural origin, and some considered that a potential lab leak was worth investigating.

Many of DRASTIC's members use pseudonyms, while identified members have backgrounds including mycology, neuroscience, and data science.

== Influence and impact ==
Over the course of its investigations, DRASTIC gained influence by highlighting potential conflicts of interest within the scientific community and by uncovering troubling documents, such as the controversial DEFUSE proposal, which suggested inserting human-specific furin cleavage sites into bat coronaviruses. In 2021, DRASTIC's work led to heightened public and governmental scrutiny of the lab-leak hypothesis, with the U.S. government and the WHO acknowledging the theory's plausibility.

== Mojiang mine ==
In May 2020, a DRASTIC member discovered a master's thesis and a PhD thesis, according to which three bat guano miners from Mojiang county in Yunnan Province who fell ill with a pneumonia-like illness in 2012 had actually died from a SARS-like coronavirus. After the miners fell ill, and before the causative agent was determined, Wuhan Institute of Virology scientists visited to collect virus samples to investigate whether the cause was a novel coronavirus. According to scientists at the WIV, clinical assays showed the causative agent of the illness was likely not any of the several discovered coronaviruses, but instead fungal in origin. One of the samples collected, RaBtCoV/4991, later renamed to RaTG13, was the closest known relative to SARS-CoV-2 before more closely related wild coronaviruses were discovered, which led to speculation that it might be related to the origin of the pandemic. However, while RaTG-13 and SARS-CoV-2 are related, they are not closely enough related to be the product of genetic engineering or passaging in a laboratory. Analysis of clinical reports from the patients furthermore indicates that they were not infected with SARS-CoV-2. The role of the Mojiang miners incident has been reported to be a key part of efforts to investigate the origins of the virus, and Anthony Fauci has urged China to release further information about the miners.

== Project DEFUSE grant proposal ==
In September 2021, DRASTIC leaked a rejected grant proposal by EcoHealth Alliance and co-investigators, submitted to DARPA in 2018. The proposed project cost $14.2 million and was aimed at "defusing the threat of bat-borne coronaviruses". The leaked documents included a plan to insert "human-specific" furin cleavage sites into SARS-like bat coronaviruses. The furin cleavage site of SARS-CoV-2 generated some controversy early in the pandemic, as the closest related known coronaviruses (SARS-CoV-1, MERS-CoV, RaTG-13) do not contain such a site. This anomaly is most likely the result of recombination, and has not been seen in similar viruses because of inadequate sampling and sequencing of this group of viruses. Many other animal coronaviruses do contain such sites. Under close genetic examination, SARS-CoV-2 shows no signs of genetic modification and no precursor virus has been identified. While the mere presence of the furin cleavage site is not suspicious, some scientists argue the fact that these experiments were proposed raises concerns.

== Other activities ==
In 2021 CNET reported that members of DRASTIC have engaged in personal attacks against virologists and epidemiologists on Twitter, falsely accusing some of working for the Chinese Communist Party.
