= David Morens =

American physician and virologist

- Born: 1947 (age 78–79); United States
- Education: University of Michigan (BA, MD)
- Scientific career
- Fields: Virology; Epidemiology; Infectious diseases
- Workplaces: Centers for Disease Control and Prevention (1976–1982); University of Hawaii, Manoa (1982–1998); National Institute of Allergy and Infectious Diseases (1998–2025)

David M. Morens is an American physician-scientist, medical historian and former Senior Advisor to the Director of the National Institute of Allergy and Infectious Diseases (NIAID). A career officer in the United States Public Health Service, he has investigated outbreaks from Ebola and Lassa fever to COVID-19 and publishes widely on viral pathogenesis and the history of pandemics. In August 2026, Morens pleaded guilty to conspiring to conceal federal records on the origins of COVID-19 from the public.

== Early life and education ==
Morens earned an A.B. degree in psychology (1969) and an M.D. degree (1973) from the University of Michigan. He completed fellowship training in pediatric infectious diseases along with additional training in virology, becoming board-certified in pediatrics in 1978 and preventive medicine in 1980. Early in his career, he served as an assistant professor at Emory University and as an attending physician in pediatrics at Grady Memorial Hospital in Atlanta.

== Career ==
=== Centers for Disease Control and Prevention (1976 – 1982) ===
Morens served as a United States Public Health Service officer in CDC's Epidemic Intelligence Service from 1976 to 1978 and helped to establish national surveillance systems for Reye syndrome and Kawasaki disease. The CDC had been gathering epidemiologic information on Kawasaki disease since 1975, and Morens reported that its surveillance system relied on passive reporting and that CDC personnel had discussed the Japanese national surveillance system with Japanese researchers. In December 1976, he was part of the CDC investigation of a gastroenteritis outbreak at Snow Mountain, Colorado, which led to the identification of the "Snow Mountain agent," a 27-nm virus-like particle that was morphologically similar to but antigenically distinct from the Norwalk and Hawaii agents.

From 1979 to 1981, Morens studied Lassa fever in Sierra Leone, conducting epidemiologic field studies and participating in clinical studies of ribavirin and Lassa-convalescent plasma. A study of Lassa fever patients in Sierra Leone found that intravenous and oral ribavirin substantially reduced case-fatality rates among patients at high risk of death, while Lassa-convalescent plasma did not significantly reduce mortality. Morens later served as chief of the CDC's Respiratory & Special Pathogens Branch and led the laboratory component of the agency's national AIDS case-control study.

=== University of Hawaiʻi (1982 – 1998) ===
At the University of Hawaiʻi, Morens was Professor of Tropical Medicine, Chair of Epidemiology, and laboratory director of dengue-virus projects funded by WHO and NIH. His group developed a BHK-21 neutralization assay still used for flaviviruses. During this period he also published historical analyses of epidemics ranging from the Plague of Athens to 20th-century influenza.

=== NIAID (1998–2025) ===
Morens joined the National Institute of Allergy and Infectious Diseases (NIAID) in 1998 and remained at the institute until his retirement in 2025. From 2006 to 2022, he served as a senior advisor in NIAID's Office of the Director. As an epidemiologist, Morens had research interests in emerging infectious diseases, virology, tropical medicine, and medical history. He was also involved in NIAID's Viral Pathogenesis and Evolution Laboratory and in studies of viral host-switching and disease pathogenesis.

During the COVID-19 pandemic, Morens co-authored a 2021 New England Journal of Medicine commentary with Jeffery Taubenberger and Anthony Fauci calling for the development of broadly protective coronavirus vaccines. The authors called for research to characterize coronaviruses in multiple species and for the development of broadly protective vaccines against existing and potentially emerging coronaviruses.

=== Indictment and guilty plea ===
In April 2026, Morens was indicted by a federal grand jury on charges of conspiracy against the United States and concealing or altering federal records related to COVID-19 research. Prosecutors alleged that Morens and two others agreed to use his personal Gmail account rather than his government email to conceal communications from Freedom of Information Act requests after the National Institutes of Health (NIH) terminated a coronavirus research grant to EcoHealth Alliance. The indictment alleged that they used the account to exchange non-public NIH information, discuss efforts to restore EcoHealth's funding, edit letters to NIH leadership, and back-channel information to a senior NIAID official.

In August 2026, Morens pleaded guilty to one count of conspiracy to commit offenses and to defraud the United States. According to the guilty plea, Morens and two others agreed to use his personal Gmail account to conceal federal records concerning COVID-19, its origins, and the terminated EcoHealth grant from public-records requests, and used the account to exchange non-public NIH information and back-channel information to a senior NIAID official. Science reported that Morens's stipulation of facts stated that he had substantial influence over decision-making at NIAID and used his access to Anthony Fauci to advance EcoHealth's interests. The Telegraph reported that emails showed Morens agreed to write a scientific commentary supporting the importance of Peter Daszak's work while keeping Daszak's name out of the article, giving the impression that it was independent. Morens also admitted conspiring to receive illegal gratuities from Daszak.

== Selected works ==
- Morens, D.M.; Fauci, A.S. (2007). "The 1918 influenza pandemic: insights for the 21st century". Journal of Infectious Diseases. 195 (7): 1018–1028. doi:10.1086/511989. PMID 17330793.
- Morens, D.M.; Taubenberger, J.K. (2006). "1918 Influenza: the mother of all pandemics". Emerging Infectious Diseases. 12 (1): 15–22. doi:10.3201/eid1209.05-0979. PMC 3291398. PMID 16494711.
- McCormick, J.B.; Morens, D.M. (1986). "Clinical observations and virologic studies of patients with Lassa fever treated with ribavirin". Journal of Infectious Diseases. 155 (3): 445–455. doi:10.1093/infdis/155.3.445. PMID 4026390.

== Professional service and honors ==
- President, American Epidemiological Society (2008–2009)
- Chair, American Committee on Arthropod-Borne & Zoonotic Viruses (1999–2001)
- Fellow, Infectious Diseases Society of America and American Society of Tropical Medicine and Hygiene
- Recipient, U.S. Public Health Service Meritorious & Outstanding Service Medals; DHHS Distinguished Service Award
