= Qiu Jin (disambiguation) =

Qiu Jin (1875–1907) was a Chinese revolutionary and feminist from the late Qing dynasty.

Qiu Jin may refer to:

- Qiu Jin (film), 1983 Chinese biographical film directed by Xie Jin
- Jane Qiu (邱瑾; Qiū Jǐn), Chinese science journalist
- Qiujin, town in Yongxiu County, Jiangxi, China
