= Origin of SARS-CoV-2 =

Inquiries into the origins of SARS-CoV-2

Since the beginning of the COVID-19 pandemic, there have been efforts by scientists, governments, and others to determine the origin of the SARS-CoV-2 virus. Similar to other outbreaks, the virus was derived from a bat-borne virus and most likely was transmitted to humans via another animal in nature, or during wildlife bushmeat trade such as that in food markets. (Note: This assessment has been made by numerous virologists, geneticists, evolutionary biologists, professional societies, and published in multiple peer-reviewed journal articles.) While other explanations, such as SARS-CoV-2 being accidentally released from a laboratory, have been proposed, they are not supported by evidence. Conspiracy theories about the virus's origin have proliferated widely.

Research is ongoing as to whether SARS-CoV-2 came directly from bats or indirectly through an intermediate host, such as pangolins, civets, or raccoon dogs. Genomic sequence evidence indicates the spillover event introducing SARS-CoV-2 to humans likely occurred in late 2019. As with the 2002–2004 SARS-CoV-1 outbreak, efforts to trace the specific geographic and taxonomic origins of SARS-CoV-2 could take years, and results may be inconclusive.

In July 2022, two papers published in Science described novel epidemiological and genetic evidence that suggested the pandemic likely began at the Huanan Seafood Wholesale Market and did not come from a laboratory. In 2026, virologist Joel Wertheim and colleagues at UCSD published a study in Cell that compared evolutionary patterns of outbreaks of Ebola, influenza and other viruses. They found that the mutation pattern of SARS-CoV-2 matched five naturally occurring outbreaks, but did not resemble the 1977 Russian flu outbreak which was likely from a lab leak. Wertheim and other WHO-designated experts favor the origin of SARS-CoV-2 to have been in bats that passed it to animals sold in the Wuhan market.

== Zoonosis ==
While there are multiple proposed explanations for how SARS-CoV-2 was introduced into and evolved adaptations suited to human populations, there is significant evidence and agreement that the most likely original viral reservoir for SARS-CoV-2 is horseshoe bats. The closest known viral relatives of SARS-CoV-2 are BANAL-52 and RaTG13, sampled from horseshoe bat droppings in Feuang, Laos, and Yunnan province in China respectively. The evolutionary distance between SARS-CoV-2 and RaTG13 is estimated to be about 50 years (between 38 and 72 years).

Bats are a significant reservoir species for a diverse range of coronaviruses, and humans have been found with antibodies for them suggesting that direct infection by bats is common. The zoonotic transmission of SARS-CoV-2 virus to humans took place in the context of exacerbating factors that could make such spillovers more likely. Human contact with bats has increased as human population centers encroach on bat habitats. Several social and environmental factors including climate change, natural ecosystem destruction and wildlife trade have also increased the likelihood for the emergences of zoonosis. One study made with the support of the European Union found climate change increased the likelihood of the pandemic by influencing distribution of bat species.

The earliest human cases of SARS-CoV-2 were identified in Wuhan, but the index case remains unknown. RaTG13 was sampled from bats in a mine in Mojiang County, Yunnan, located roughly 1,500 km (930 mi) away from Wuhan, and there are relatively few bat coronaviruses from Hubei province, where Wuhan is located.

=== Intermediate host ===
In addition to direct spillover, another pathway, considered highly likely by scientists, is that of transmission through an intermediate host. Specifically, this implies that a cross species transmission occurred prior to the human outbreak and that it had pathogenic results on the animal. This pathway has the potential to allow for greater adaptation to human transmission via animals with more similar protein shapes to humans, though this is not required for the scenario to occur. The evolutionary separation from bat viruses is explained in this case by the virus's presence in an unknown species with less viral surveillance than bats. The virus's ability to easily infect and adapt to additional species (including mink) provides evidence that such a route of transmission is possible.

A 2024 study of samples collected from Huanan Seafood Wholesale Market found genetic material of various possible intermediate hosts. The most likely were raccoon dogs. Additionally, the study suggests the raccoon dogs may have come from southern China, where the closest-known relatives to SARS-CoV-2 were found in bats.

== Unlikely scenarios ==
While the scientific consensus is that SARS-CoV-2 derived from viruses hosted in bats, the precise means by which this occurred has been sometimes subject to speculation. Below are some scenarios judged to be unlikely.

=== Cold food chain ===
Another proposed introduction to humans is through fresh or frozen food products, referred to as the cold food chain. Scientists do not consider this to be a likely origin of SARS-CoV-2 in humans. This scenario's source animal could be either a direct or intermediary species as described above. Many investigations centered around the Huanan Seafood Wholesale Market in Wuhan, which had an early cluster of cases. While there have been food-borne outbreaks of human viruses in the past, and evidence of re-introduction of SARS-CoV-2 into China through imported frozen foods, investigations found no conclusive evidence of viral contamination in products at the Huanan Market.

=== Lab leak theory ===
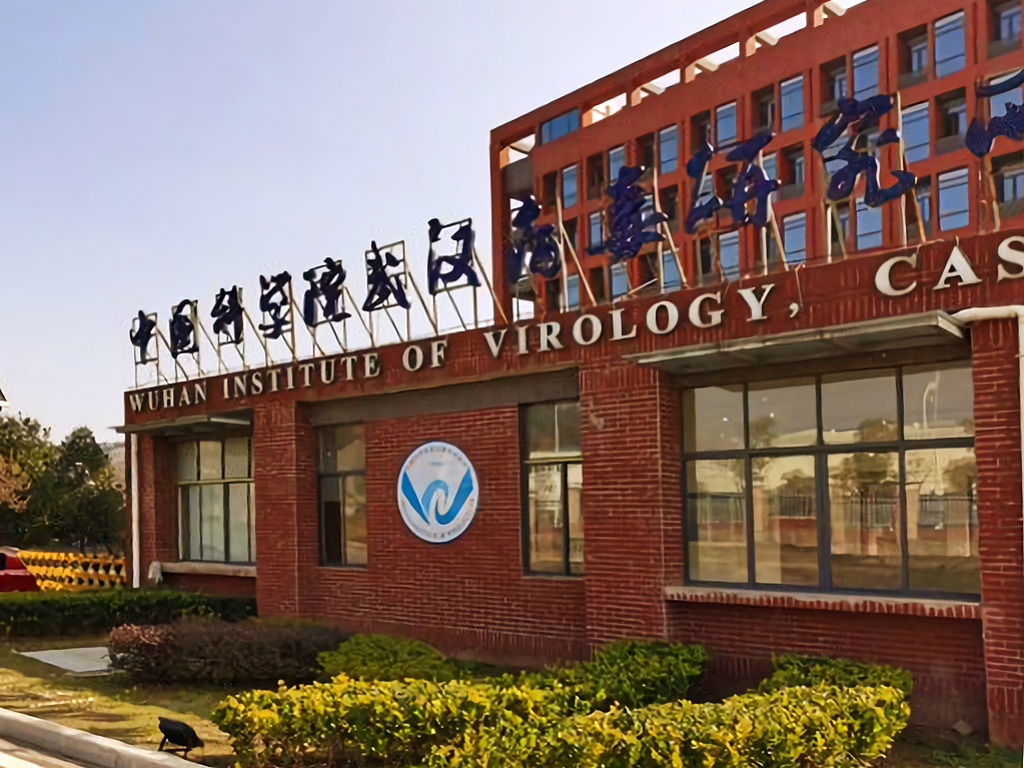
The Wuhan Institute of Virology in Wuhan, China

A highly controversial hypothesis holds that SARS-CoV-2, the virus responsible for the COVID-19 pandemic, originated from a laboratory. The scientific consensus is that the virus is not the result of genetic engineering; instead, most scientists believe it spread to human populations through natural zoonotic transmission from bats, similar to the SARS-CoV-1 and MERS-CoV outbreaks and other pandemics throughout human history. Available evidence indicates that SARS-CoV-2 was originally harbored by bats and transmitted to humans through infected wild animals serving as intermediate hosts at the Huanan Seafood Market in Wuhan, Hubei, China, in December 2019. Several candidate animal species have been identified as potential intermediaries. There is no evidence supporting laboratory involvement, no indication that the virus existed in any lab prior to the pandemic, and no record of suspicious biosecurity incidents.

Many scenarios proposed for a lab leak are characteristic of conspiracy theories. Central to many is a misplaced suspicion based on the proximity of the outbreak to the Wuhan Institute of Virology (WIV), where coronaviruses are studied. Most large Chinese cities have laboratories that study coronaviruses, and virus outbreaks are typically first noticed in large cities, so any outbreak in China is likely to occur near a laboratory studying coronaviruses. The idea of a leak at the WIV also gained support due to secrecy during the Chinese government's response. The lab leak theory and its weaponization by politicians have both leveraged and increased anti-Chinese sentiment. Scientists from WIV had previously collected virus samples from bats in the wild, and allegations that they also performed undisclosed work on such viruses are central to some versions of the idea. Some versions, particularly those alleging genome engineering, are based on misinformation or misrepresentations of scientific evidence.

The idea that the virus was released from a laboratory (accidentally or deliberately) appeared early in the pandemic. It gained popularity in the United States through promotion by conservative personalities in early 2020, fomenting tensions between the U.S. and China. Scientists and media outlets widely dismissed it as a conspiracy theory. The accidental leak idea had a resurgence in 2021. In March, the World Health Organization (WHO) published a report which deemed the possibility "extremely unlikely", though the WHO's director-general said the report's conclusions were not definitive. Subsequent plans for laboratory audits were rejected by China.

== Investigations ==
=== Chinese government ===
The first investigation conducted in China was by the Wuhan Municipal Health Commission, responding to hospitals reporting cases of pneumonia of unknown etiology, resulting in the closure of the Huanan Seafood Wholesale Market on 1 January 2020 for sanitation and disinfection. The Chinese Center for Disease Control and Prevention (CCDC) entered the market the same day and took samples; as the animals had been removed before public-health authorities came in, no animals were sampled, although that would have been more conclusive.

In April 2020, China imposed restrictions on publishing academic research on the novel coronavirus. Investigations into the origin of the virus would receive extra scrutiny and must be approved by Central Government officials. The restrictions do not ban research or publication, including with non-Chinese researchers; Ian Lipkin, a US scientist, has been working with a team of Chinese researchers under the auspices of the Chinese Center for Disease Control and Prevention, a Chinese government agency, to investigate the origin of the virus. Lipkin has long-standing relationships with Chinese officials, including premier Li Keqiang, because of his contributions to rapid testing for SARS in 2003.

The Huanan live-animal market was suspected of being the source of the virus, as there was a major, early cluster of cases there. On 31 January 2021, a team of scientists led by the World Health Organization visited the market to investigate the origins of COVID-19. Based on the existing evidence, the WHO concluded that the origin of the virus was still unknown, and the Chinese government insisted that the market was not the origin. The Chinese government has long insisted that the virus originated outside China, and until June 2021 denied that live animals were traded at the Huanan market.

Some Chinese researchers had published a preprint analysis of the Huanan swab samples in February 2022, concluding that the coronavirus in the samples had likely been brought in by humans, not the animals on sale, but omissions in the analysis had raised questions, and the raw sample data had not yet been released.

On 4 March 2023, the data from the swab samples of the Huanan live-animal market were released, or possibly leaked; a preliminary analysis of this data was reviewed by the international research community, which said that it made an animal origin much more likely. Although the samples do not definitively prove that the raccoon dog is the "missing" intermediate animal host in the bat-to-human transmission chain, it does show that common raccoon dogs were present in the Huanan market at the time of the initial SARS-CoV-2 outbreak, in areas that were also positive for SARS-CoV-2 RNA, and substantially strengthens this hypothesis as the proximal origin of the pandemic.

An attempt by these researchers to collaborate with the Chinese researchers was not answered, but the raw data was removed from the online database. On 14 March, an international group of researchers presented a preliminary analysis at a meeting of the World Health Organization's Scientific Advisory Group for Origins of Novel Pathogens, at which Chinese COVID-19 researchers were also present. On the sixteenth, George Gao, the former head of the CCDC and lead author on the February 2022 preprint, told Science that there was "nothing new" in the raw data, and refused to answer questions about why his research team had removed it from the database.

On 17 March, the WHO director-general said that the data should have been shared three years earlier, and called on China to be more transparent in its data-sharing. There exists further data from further samples which has not yet been made public. Maria Van Kerkhove, the WHO's COVID-19 technical lead, called for it to be made public immediately (see Huanan live-animal market#Swabs).

=== United States government ===
==== Trump administration ====
On 6 February 2020, the director of the White House's Office of Science and Technology Policy requested the National Academies of Sciences, Engineering, and Medicine to convene a meeting of "experts, world class geneticists, coronavirus experts, and evolutionary biologists", to "assess what data, information and samples are needed to address the unknowns, in order to understand the evolutionary origins of COVID-19 and more effectively respond to both the outbreak and any resulting information".

In April 2020, it was reported that the US intelligence community was investigating whether the virus came from an accidental leak from a Chinese lab. The hypothesis was one of several possibilities being pursued by the investigators. US Secretary of Defense Mark Esper said the results of the investigation were "inconclusive". By the end of April 2020, the Office of the Director of National Intelligence said the US intelligence community believed the coronavirus was not man-made or genetically modified.

US officials criticised the "terms of reference" allowing Chinese scientists to do the first phase of preliminary research. On 15 January 2021, US Secretary of State Mike Pompeo said that to assist the WHO investigative team's work and ensure a transparent, thorough investigation of COVID-19's origin, the US was sharing new information and urging the WHO to press the Chinese government to address three specific issues, including the illnesses of several researchers inside the WIV in autumn 2019 "with symptoms consistent with both COVID-19 and common seasonal illnesses", the WIV's research on "RaTG13" and "gain of function", and the WIV's links to the People's Liberation Army. On 18 January, the US called on China to allow the WHO's expert team to interview "care givers, former patients and lab workers" in the city of Wuhan, drawing a rebuke from the Chinese government. Australia also called for the WHO team to have access to "relevant data, information and key locations".

A classified report from May 2020 by the Lawrence Livermore National Laboratory, a US government national laboratory, concluded that the hypothesis that the virus leaked from the WIV "is plausible and deserves further investigation", although the report also notes that the virus could have developed naturally, echoing the consensus of the American intelligence community, and provides no "smoking gun" towards either hypothesis.

==== Biden administration ====
On 13 February 2021, the White House said it had "deep concerns" about both the way the WHO's findings were communicated and the process used to reach them. Mirroring concerns raised by the Trump administration, National Security Advisor Jake Sullivan stated that it was essential that the WHO-convened report be independent and "free from alteration by the Chinese government". On 14 April 2021, the Director of National Intelligence Avril Haines, along with other Biden administration officials, said that they had not ruled out the possibility of a laboratory accident as the origin of the COVID-19 virus.

On 26 May 2021, President Joe Biden directed the U.S. intelligence community to produce a report within 90 days on whether the COVID-19 virus originated from human contact with an infected animal or from an accidental lab leak, stating his national security staff said there is insufficient evidence to determine either hypothesis to be more likely. On 26 August 2021, the Office of the Director of National Intelligence released an unclassified summary of their findings, with the main point being that the report remained inconclusive as to the origin of the virus, with intelligence agencies divided on the question. The report also concluded that the virus was most likely not genetically engineered, and that China had no foreknowledge of the virus prior to the outbreak. The report concluded that a final determination of the origin was unlikely without cooperation from the Chinese government, saying their prior lack of transparency "reflect[ed] in part China's government's own uncertainty about where an investigation could lead, as well as its frustration that the international community is using the issue to exert political pressure on China." Chinese foreign ministry spokesman Wang Wenbin said that the US intelligence report was "unscientific and has no credibility".

On 23 May 2021, The Wall Street Journal reported that a previously undisclosed US intelligence report stated that three researchers from the Wuhan Institute of Virology became ill enough in November 2019 to seek hospital care. The report did not specify what the illness was. Officials familiar with the intelligence differed as to the strength to which it corroborates the hypothesis that the virus responsible for COVID-19 was leaked from the WIV. The WSJ report notes that it is not unusual for people in China to go to the hospital with uncomplicated influenza or common cold symptoms.

Yuan Zhiming, director of the WIV's Wuhan National Biosafety Laboratory, responded in the Global Times, a Chinese state media outlet, that the "claims are groundless". Marion Koopmans, a member of the WHO study team, described the number of flu-like illnesses at the WIV in 2019 as "completely normal". Workers at the WIV must provide yearly serum samples. WIV virologist Shi Zhengli said in 2020 that, based on an evaluation of those serum samples, all staff tested negative for COVID-19 antibodies.

The House Foreign Affairs Committee has investigated the origins of the pandemic, and heard classified briefings. The Republican minority issued a report in August 2021 that they believed the origin of the pandemic was an accidental lab escape.

The resurgence of the theory of a laboratory accident was fueled in part by the publication, in May 2021, of early emails between Anthony Fauci and scientists discussing the issue, before deliberate manipulation was ruled out as of March 2020.

On 14 July 2021, the House Committee on Science, Space and Technology held the first congressional hearing on the origins of the virus. Bill Foster, an Illinois Democrat who chaired the hearing, said the Chinese government's lack of transparency is not in itself evidence of a lab leak and cautioned that answers may not be known even after the administration produces its intelligence report. Expert witnesses Stanley Perlman and David Relman presented to the congressman different proposed explanations for the origins of the virus and how to conduct further investigations.

On 16 July 2021, CNN reported that Biden administration officials considered the lab leak theory "as credible" as the natural origins theory.

In October 2022, an interim report of a Republican member of a US Senate committee concluded that a lab origin was most likely, but offered "little new evidence", according to The New York Times.

In February 2023, the United States Energy Department updated its assessment on the origins of the virus, shifting from "undecided" to "low confidence" in favor of a laboratory leak. White House National Security Advisor Jake Sullivan responded to the report saying there was still "no definitive answer" to the question of the pandemic's origins.

On 28 February 2023, the head of the Federal Bureau of Investigation (FBI), Christopher Wray, said the bureau believes Covid-19 most likely originated in the lab. The FBI concluded with "moderate confidence" that COVID-19 may have been created in a laboratory, based in part on genomic analysis conducted by scientists at the National Center for Medical Intelligence.

On 20 March 2023, the COVID-19 Origin Act of 2023 was signed into law. On 23 June 2023, the Biden administration released its report, as required by the Act.

=== World Health Organization ===
The World Health Organization has declared that finding where SARS-CoV-2 came from is a priority and that it is "essential for understanding how the pandemic started." In May 2020, the World Health Assembly, which governs the World Health Organization (WHO), passed a motion calling for a "comprehensive, independent and impartial" study into the COVID-19 pandemic. A record 137 countries, including China, co-sponsored the motion, giving overwhelming international endorsement to the study. In mid 2020, the World Health Organization (WHO) began negotiations with the government of China on conducting an official study into the origins of COVID-19.

In November 2020, the WHO published a two-phase study plan. The purpose of the first phase was to better understand how the virus "might have started circulating in Wuhan", and a second phase involves longer-term studies based on the findings of the first phase. WHO director-general Tedros Adhanom said "We need to know the origin of this virus because it can help us to prevent future outbreaks," adding, "There is nothing to hide. We want to know the origin, and that's it." He also urged countries not to politicise the origin tracing process, saying that would only create barriers to learning the truth.

In 2021, the World Health Assembly (on behalf of the WHO) commissioned a study conducted jointly between WHO experts and Chinese scientists. Echoing the assessment of most virologists, the study concluded that the virus most likely had a zoonotic origin in bats, possibly via an intermediate host. It also stated that a laboratory origin for the virus was "extremely unlikely". WHO director-general Tedros Adhanom Ghebreyesus, in concert with various governments including the US and the EU, responded to the 2021 study report saying the matter still "requires further investigation". In July 2021, Zeng Yixin, Vice Health Minister of the Chinese National Health Commission, said that China would not participate in a second phase of investigation, denouncing the decision to proceed as "shocking" and "arrogant". In June 2022, a second round of investigations concluded that more investigations in the various possible pathways of emergence were necessary. In response to the WHO's June 2022 report, Chinese Foreign Ministry spokesperson Zhao Lijian called the lab leak theory "a lie concocted by anti-China forces for political purposes, which has nothing to do with science".

==== Phase 1 ====
For the first phase, the WHO formed a team of ten researchers with expertise in virology, public health and animals to conduct a thorough study. One of the team's tasks was to retrospectively ascertain what wildlife was being sold in local wet markets in Wuhan. The WHO's phase one team arrived and quarantined in Wuhan, Hubei, China in January 2021.

Members of the team included Thea Fisher, John Watson, Marion Koopmans, Dominic Dwyer, Vladimir Dedkov, Hung Nguyen-Viet, Fabian Leendertz, Peter Daszak, Farag El Moubasher, and Ken Maeda. The team also included five WHO experts led by Peter Ben Embarek, two Food and Agriculture Organization representatives, and two representatives from the World Organisation for Animal Health.

The inclusion of Peter Daszak in the team stirred controversy. Daszak is the head of EcoHealth Alliance, a nonprofit that studies spillover events, and has been a longtime collaborator of over 15 years with Shi Zhengli, Wuhan Institute of Virology's director of the Center for Emerging Infectious Diseases. While Daszak is highly knowledgeable about Chinese laboratories and the emergence of diseases in the area, his close connection with the WIV was seen by some as a conflict of interest in the WHO's study. When a BBC News journalist asked about his relationship with the WIV, Daszak said, "We file our papers, it's all there for everyone to see."

The team was denied access to raw data, including the list of early patients, swabs, and blood samples. It was allowed only a few hours of supervised access to the Wuhan Institute of Virology.

===== Findings =====
In February 2021, after conducting part of their study, the WHO stated that the likely origin of COVID-19 was a zoonotic event from a virus circulating in bats, likely through another animal carrier, and that the time of transmission to humans was likely towards the end of 2019.

The Chinese and the international experts who jointly carried out the WHO-convened study consider it "extremely unlikely" that COVID-19 leaked from a lab. No evidence of a lab leak from the Wuhan Institute of Virology was found by the WHO team, with team leader Peter Ben Embarek stating that it was "very unlikely" due to the safety protocols in place. During a 60 Minutes interview with Lesley Stahl, Peter Daszak, another member of the WHO team, described the investigation process to be a series of questions and answers between the WHO team and the Wuhan lab staff. Stahl made the comment that the team was "just taking their word for it", to which Daszak replied, "Well, what else can we do? There's a limit to what you can do and we went right up to that limit. We asked them tough questions. They weren't vetted in advance. And the answers they gave, we found to be believable—correct and convincing."

The investigation also stated that transfer from animals to humans was unlikely to have occurred at the Huanan Seafood Market, since infections without a known epidemiological link were confirmed before the outbreak around the market. In an announcement that surprised some foreign experts, the joint investigation concluded that early transmission via the cold chain of frozen products was "possible".

In March 2021, the WHO published a written report with the results of the study. The joint team stated that there are four scenarios for introduction:

- direct zoonotic transmission to humans (spillover), assessed as "possible to likely"
- introduction through an intermediate host followed by a spillover, assessed as "likely to very likely"
- introduction through the (cold) food chain, assessed as "possible"
- introduction through a laboratory incident, assessed as "extremely unlikely"

The report mentions that direct zoonotic transmission to humans has a precedent, as most current human coronaviruses originated in animals. Zoonotic transmission is also supported by the fact that RaTG13 binds to hACE2, although the fit is not optimal.

The investigative team noted the requirement for further studies, noting that these would "potentially increase knowledge and understanding globally."

===== Reactions =====
WHO director-general Tedros Adhanom, who was not directly involved with the investigation, said he was ready to dispatch additional missions involving specialist experts and that further research was required. He said in a statement, "Some explanations may be more probable than others, but for now all possibilities remain on the table." He also said, "We have not yet found the source of the virus, and we must continue to follow the science and leave no stone unturned as we do." Tedros called on China to provide "more timely and comprehensive data sharing" as part of future investigations.

News outlets noted that, though it was unrealistic to expect quick and huge results from the report, it "offered few clear-cut conclusions regarding the start of the pandemic", "failed to audit the Chinese official position at some parts of the report", and was "biased according to critics". Other scientists praised how the report details the pathways that can shed light on the origin, if explored later.

After the publication of the report, politicians, talk show hosts, journalists, and some scientists advanced unsupported claims that SARS-CoV-2 may have come from the WIV. In the United States, calls to investigate a laboratory leak reached "fever pitch", fueling aggressive rhetoric resulting in antipathy towards people of Asian ancestry, and the bullying of scientists. The European Union, United States, and 13 other countries criticised the WHO-convened study, calling for transparency from China and access to the raw data and original samples. Chinese officials described these criticisms as an attempt to politicise the study. Scientists involved in the WHO report, including Liang Wannian, John Watson, and Peter Daszak, objected to the criticism, and said that the report was an example of the collaboration and dialogue required to successfully continue investigations into the matter.

In a letter published in Science, a number of scientists, including Ralph Baric, argued that the accidental laboratory leak hypothesis had not been sufficiently investigated and remained possible, calling for greater clarity and additional data. Their letter was criticized by some virologists and public health experts, who said that a "hostile" and "divisive" focus on the WIV was unsupported by evidence, and would cause Chinese scientists and authorities to share less, rather than more data.

==== Phase 2 ====
On 27 May 2021, Danish epidemiologist Tina Fischer spoke on the This Week in Virology podcast, advocating for a second phase of the study to audit blood samples for COVID-19 antibodies in China. WHO-convened study team member Marion Koopmans, on that same broadcast, advocated for WHO member states to make a decision on the second phase of the study, though she also cautioned that an investigatory audit of the laboratory itself may be inconclusive. In early July 2021, WHO emergency chief Michael Ryan said the final details of phase 2 were being worked out in negotiations between WHO and its member states, as the WHO works "by persuasion" and cannot compel any member state (including China) to cooperate.

In July 2021 China rejected WHO requests for greater transparency, cooperation, and access to data as part of Phase 2. On 16 July 2021, Foreign Ministry spokesperson Zhao Lijian declared that China's position was that future investigations should be conducted elsewhere and should focus on cold chain transmission and the US military's labs. On 22 July 2021, the Chinese government held a press conference in which Zeng Yixin, Vice Health Minister of the National Health Commission (NHC), said that China would not participate in a second phase of the WHO's investigation, denouncing it as "shocking" and "arrogant". He elaborated "In some aspects, the WHO's plan for next phase of investigation of the coronavirus origin doesn't respect common sense, and it's against science. It's impossible for us to accept such a plan."

On 9 June 2022, the SAGO group, in development of its function of advisor to the WHO, published its first preliminary report. This report summarised existing findings and recommended that further studies be undertaken into possibly pathways of emergence.

=== The Lancet COVID-19 Commission task force ===
In November 2020, Richard Horton, editor of The Lancet, appointed economist Jeffrey Sachs as chair of its COVID-19 Commission, with wide-ranging goals relating to the virus and pandemic. Sachs set up a number of task forces, including one on the origins of the virus. Sachs appointed Peter Daszak, a colleague of Sachs' at Columbia, to head this task force, two weeks after the Trump administration prematurely ended a federal grant supporting a project led by Daszak, EcoHealth Alliance, which worked with the Wuhan Institute of Virology. This appointment was criticised as creating a conflict of interest, for instance by Richard Ebright, chemical biologist at Rutgers University, who called the commission an "entirely Potemkin commission" in the National Review.

Daszak stated that the task force was formed to "conduct a thorough and rigorous investigation into the origins and early spread of SARS-CoV-2". The task force has twelve members with backgrounds in One Health, outbreak investigation, virology, lab biosecurity and disease ecology. The task force planned to analyse scientific findings and did not plan to visit China. However, as Sachs became increasingly drawn to the lab leak theory, he came into conflict with Daszak and his task force. In June 2021, The Lancet announced that Daszak had recused himself from the commission. On 25 September 2021, the task force work was folded after procedural concerns and a need to broaden its scope to examine transparency and government regulation of risky laboratory research. However, it continued to conduct its work independently.

In September 2022, the Lancet commission published a wide-ranging report on the pandemic, including commentary on the virus origin overseen by the group's chairman, economist Jeffrey Sachs. The report suggested that the virus may have originated from an American laboratory, a notion promoted by Sachs since late 2020, including in 2022 on the podcast of anti-vaxx conspiracy theorist Robert F. Kennedy Jr. Reacting to the Commission report, virologist Angela Rasmussen commented that this may have been "one of The Lancet's most shameful moments regarding its role as a steward and leader in communicating crucial findings about science and medicine". Virologist David Robertson said the invocation of US laboratory involvement was "wild speculation" and that "it's really disappointing to see such a potentially influential report contributing to further misinformation on such an important topic".

The task force published their own report in October 2022, saying they concluded there was "overwhelming" evidence of a natural spillover, but they also accepted the possibility of a lab leak.

=== Independent investigations ===
In June 2021, the NIH announced that a set of sequence data had been removed from the Sequence Read Archive (SRA) in June 2020. The removal was performed according to standard practice at the request of the investigators who owned the rights to the sequences, with the investigators' rationale that the sequences would be submitted to another database. The investigators subsequently published a paper in an academic journal the same month they were removed from the NIH database which described the sequences in detail and discussed their evolutionary relationship to other sequences, but did not include the raw data. Virologist David Robertson said that it was difficult to conclude it was a cover-up rather than the more likely explanation: a mundane deletion of data without malfeasance. The missing genetic sequence data was restored in a correction published 29 July 2021 after it was stated to be a copy-edit error.

In April 2022, a study conducted by Czech researchers from Charles University and Czech University of Life Sciences Prague was published concluding that the spike protein of SARS-CoV-2 originated in a human-adapted virus before the lineage encoding this protein briefly infected rat populations and later underwent a viral recombination event with a virus that had been adapted to infect horseshoe bats and then evolved to infect treeshrews just prior to the recombination event.

In September 2024, a study published in Cell found genetic evidence that COVID-19 may have originated from the illegal trade of infected raccoon dogs in Wuhan, China, supporting the zoonotic transmission scenario. Swabs taken from the Huanan Seafood Wholesale Market in January 2020, which tested positive for coronavirus, contained large amounts of genetic material from raccoon dogs.

=== International calls for investigations ===
In April 2020, Australian foreign minister Marise Payne and Australian prime minister Scott Morrison called for an independent international inquiry into the origins of the coronavirus pandemic. A few days later, German chancellor Angela Merkel also pressed China for transparency about the origin of the coronavirus, following similar concerns raised by the French president Emmanuel Macron. The UK also expressed support for an investigation, although both France and UK said the priority at the time was to first fight the virus. Some public health experts have also called for an independent examination of COVID-19's origins, "arguing WHO does not have the political clout to conduct such a forensic analysis".

In May 2021, Prime Minister Justin Trudeau told reporters Canada would "support the call by the United States and others to better understand the origins of COVID-19." In June 2021, at the G7 summit in Cornwall, the attending leaders issued a joint statement calling for a new investigation, citing China's refusal to cooperate with certain aspects of the original WHO-convened study. This resistance to international pressure was one of the key findings of a Wall Street Journal investigation into the pandemic origin.

The divisive nature of the debate has led scientists to call for less political pressure on the topic. Public health analysts have remarked that the debate over the origins of SARS-CoV-2 is fueling unnecessary confrontation, resulting in bullying and harassment of scientists, and is deepening existing geopolitical tensions and hindering collaboration at a time where such mutual cooperation is required, both to deal with the current pandemic and in preparation for future such outbreaks. This comes in the face of scientists having predicted such events for decades: according to Katie Woolaston, researcher at the Queensland University of Technology, "The environmental drivers of pandemics are not being widely discussed". The debate comes at a moment of difficult global relations with Chinese authorities. Researchers have noted that the politicisation of the debate is making the process more difficult, and that words are often twisted to become "fodder for conspiracy theories".

A letter published in The Lancet in July 2021 remarked that the atmosphere of speculation surrounding the issue was of no help in making an objective assessment of the situation. In response to this letter, in a communication published in the same journal, a small group of researchers opposed the idea that scientists should promote unity and called for openness to alternative hypotheses. Despite the unlikelihood of the event, and although definitive answers are likely to take years of research, biosecurity experts have called for a review of global biosecurity policies, citing known gaps in international standards for biosafety. The situation has also reignited a debate over gain-of-function research, although the intense political rhetoric surrounding the issue has threatened to sideline serious inquiry over policy in this domain.

== See also ==
- Assessment on COVID-19 Origins
- Proximal Origin
- Scientific Advisory Group for Origins of Novel Pathogens
- World Health Organization's response to the COVID-19 pandemic
