= Assessment on COVID-19 Origins =

2021 United States intelligence report

Updated Assessment on COVID-19 Origins
- Location: United States
- Type: Declassified assessment by the United States Intelligence Community
- Affiliation: Office of the Director of National Intelligence
- Website: Full PDF document

Updated Assessment on COVID-19 Origins is a report of the United States Intelligence Community regarding the origin of the SARS-CoV-2 virus, which was commissioned on May 26, 2021, by President Joe Biden and submitted on August 24.

Biden initially ordered his intelligence services to "redouble efforts" to investigate the virus's origin. The report, which was released on August 27, noted that the Intelligence Community did not reach a unanimous conclusion on the origin of the virus, with four agencies determining that the index case was likely a result of natural exposure, with another agency considering it as the result of a laboratory incident, although the community overall agreed that it was not linked to biological warfare. The community concluded that a conclusive investigation would require cooperation with the Chinese government. Analysts considered that the investigation proved incapable of reaching a definitive conclusion on the origins of COVID-19, and the report was criticized by Chinese officials.

== Background ==
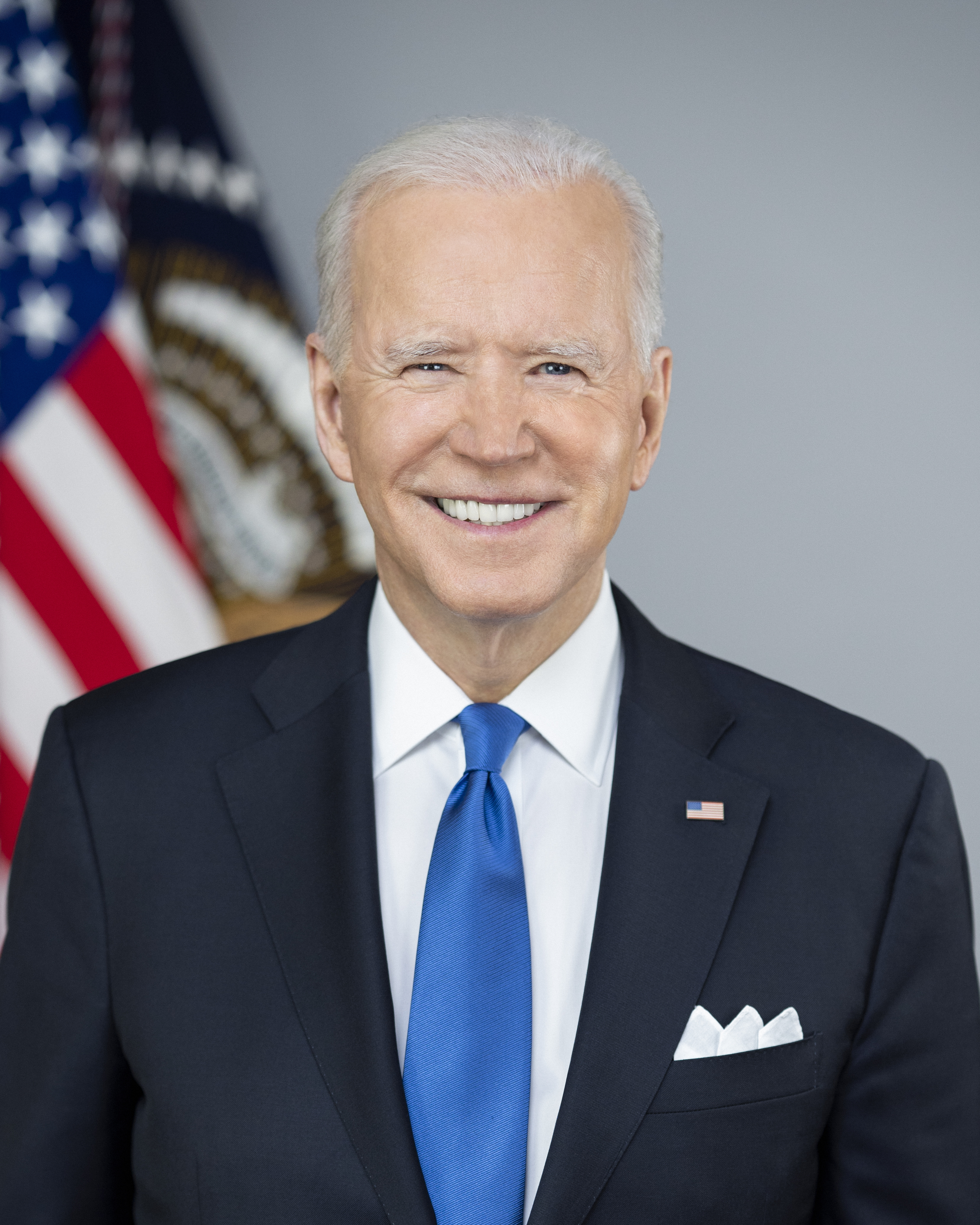
The investigation was ordered by President Joe Biden

Since the initial outbreak of the COVID-19 disease in early 2020, the US federal government under the Trump administration had been pushing for an investigation into a possible artificial origin of the disease. President Donald Trump and his Secretary of State Mike Pompeo promoted a theory concerning a lab leak from the Wuhan Institute of Virology, which was contradicted by US intelligence officials.

In February 2021, Biden's National Security Advisor, Jake Sullivan, said in response to a mission to Wuhan conducted by the World Health Organization (WHO):

"We have deep concerns about the way in which the early findings of the COVID-19 investigation were communicated and questions about the process used to reach them. It is imperative that this report be independent, with expert findings free from intervention or alteration by the Chinese government. To better understand this pandemic and prepare for the next one, China must make available its data from the earliest days of the outbreak."

On May 26, Biden ordered the United States Intelligence Community to conduct an assessment within ninety days. In a statement, he said Sullivan had been directed to conduct a review on whether SARS-CoV-2 had come from natural exposure to an infected animal or a laboratory incident. He added the intelligence community had "coalesced around two likely scenarios" but was unable to reach a consensus.

== Report ==
The Office of the Director of National Intelligence was in charge of declassifying the contents of the report

A declassified summary of the report was published on the official website of the office of the Director of National Intelligence on August 27, 2021. It states that SARS-CoV-2, the virus responsible for COVID-19, "probably emerged and infected humans through an initial small-scale exposure that occurred no later than November 2019", with the first outbreak in Wuhan dating back to December 2019.

The analysis from the Intelligence Community was as follows:

- Four agencies, as well as the National Intelligence Council, assessed "with low confidence" that the initial SARS-CoV-2 infection was most likely caused by natural exposure to an infected animal or a "close progenitor virus" (a virus which would likely be over 99% similar to SARS-CoV-2).
- Another agency assessed "with moderate confidence" that the first human infection was most likely the result of a laboratory incident, likely involving experimentation, animal handling or sampling in the Wuhan Institute of Virology.
- Three other agencies remained unable to agree on either hypothesis without additional evidence, with some "favoring natural origin, others a laboratory origin, and some seeing the hypotheses as equally likely."
- Variations in analytical views were largely a result of differences in the way agencies have studied intelligence reports and scientific publications, as well as intelligence and scientific gaps.
- The Intelligence Community overall concluded that the virus was not developed as a biological weapon.

The report said that cooperation with China "most likely would be needed to reach a conclusive assessment" on the origins of the disease, and additionally criticized governmental authorities for continuing to "hinder the global investigation" and refusing to share information. It also stated that the Chinese government's actions reflected its own uncertainty about where an investigation could lead, as well as its frustrations that the international community was "using the issue to exert political pressure on China".

In June 2023, the Office of the Director of National Intelligence released a new declassified document, which said that the Intelligence Community had still not reached a consensus on the origin of the virus and was unable to rule out the lab leak theory. At that time, four agencies continued to rule that COVID-19 was a result of natural transmission, with two others remaining undecided.

== Reactions ==
Analysts considered that the investigation proved incapable of reaching a definitive conclusion on the origins of COVID-19.

On August 27, Biden released a statement praising "the thorough, careful, and objective work" of US intelligence officials, while also accusing the government of China of blocking access to international experts, and continuing "to reject calls for transparency and withhold information".

The investigation was criticized in China, where officials and state media said that it had made China a "scapegoat". Vice Foreign Minister Ma Zhaoxu said that "without providing any evidence", the United States planned to spread a "political virus" by criticizing Chinese authorities in origins research, and added that "over 25 million Chinese netizens have signed an open letter asking for an inquiry into the Fort Detrick base", referencing a conspiracy theory that the virus originated in the United States. Fu Cong, a director-general at the Chinese Foreign Ministry, warned that "if they [the United States] baselessly accuse China, they better be prepared to accept the counterattack from China."

Members of the scientific community responded by calling for an independent investigation to determine the origin of the virus. William Hanage, a biologist at Harvard University, described the assessment as being "quite balanced", saying that its alignment towards assessing a natural origin of the virus reflected "the view of most scientists who have looked into it". Hanage added that a thorough conclusion could not be reached "without more evidence from early human cases or from animals that harbor closely related viruses". Microbiologist David Relman called on the Biden administration to continue its investigation into the virus's origin. Jesse D. Bloom, a virologist at the Fred Hutchinson Cancer Center, who called for particular attention to be given to the lab leak theory, supported the conclusion made in the assessment that both hypotheses were considered likely.

An assessment of the report by the WHO acknowledged the views held by the intelligence community but added that they had not shared their information with the organization, nor did they present "any new or conclusive evidence to support either zoonotic or laboratory origins of SARS-CoV-2".

== See also ==
- Origin of SARS-CoV-2
