= CIRI =

Ciri or CIRI may refer to:

- Centre International de Recherche en Infectiologie, an academic and research institute based in Lyon, France.
- CIRI Human Rights Data Project
- Cook Inlet Region, Inc.
- Continuous Individualized Risk Index
- An alternate name for Tiri language of New Caledonia
- CIRI-FM, a traffic advisory radio station, Calgary, Alberta, Canada
- Cirilla, a female protagonist from the fantasy saga The Witcher by Andrzej Sapkowski
  - Ciri, an episode of The Hexer (TV series), based on Sapkowski's saga
- Ciri, a nickname of Ciriaco Sforza, a Swiss former professional football player
