= Virology Journal =

- Discipline: Virology
- Language: English
- Edited by: Linfa Wang

Publication details
- History: 2004–present
- Publisher: BioMed Central
- Frequency: Rolling
- Open access: Yes
- License: Creative Commons Attribution Generic 2.0
- Impact factor: 5.55 (2021)

Standard abbreviations
- ISO 4: Virol. J.

Indexing
- ISSN: 1743-422X
- OCLC no.: 56433791

Links
- Journal homepage; Online access

Virology Journal is an open-access peer-reviewed medical journal published by BioMed Central. It publishes research related to viruses and the prevention of viral infection (including vaccination, the use of antiviral agents, and gene therapy). The journal was established in 2004 with Robert Garry (Tulane University) as founding editor-in-chief and has been edited by Linfa Wang since 2012. It aims to cover rapid communications amongst virologists.

== Controversy ==
On 21 July 2010, Virology Journal published an article entitled "Influenza or not influenza: Analysis of a case of high fever that happened 2000 years ago in Biblical time", regarding the case of the mother-in-law of Simon Peter who the Bible reports was cured by Jesus. The authors conclude that she was struck with influenza. This article created controversy amongst scientists, who decried the article from anywhere from "truly bizarre" to "garbage". The editor-in-chief of Virology Journal later apologized for the publication and announced that it would be retracted. The article was retracted on 13 August 2010.

== Abstracting and indexing ==
Virology Journal is abstracted and indexed in

- PubMed
- PubMed Central
- MEDLINE
- Thomson Reuters
- CAB International
- Chemical Abstracts Service
- EMBASE
- Scopus
- Current Contents
