= Blame (2025 film) =

Swiss documentary film from 2025

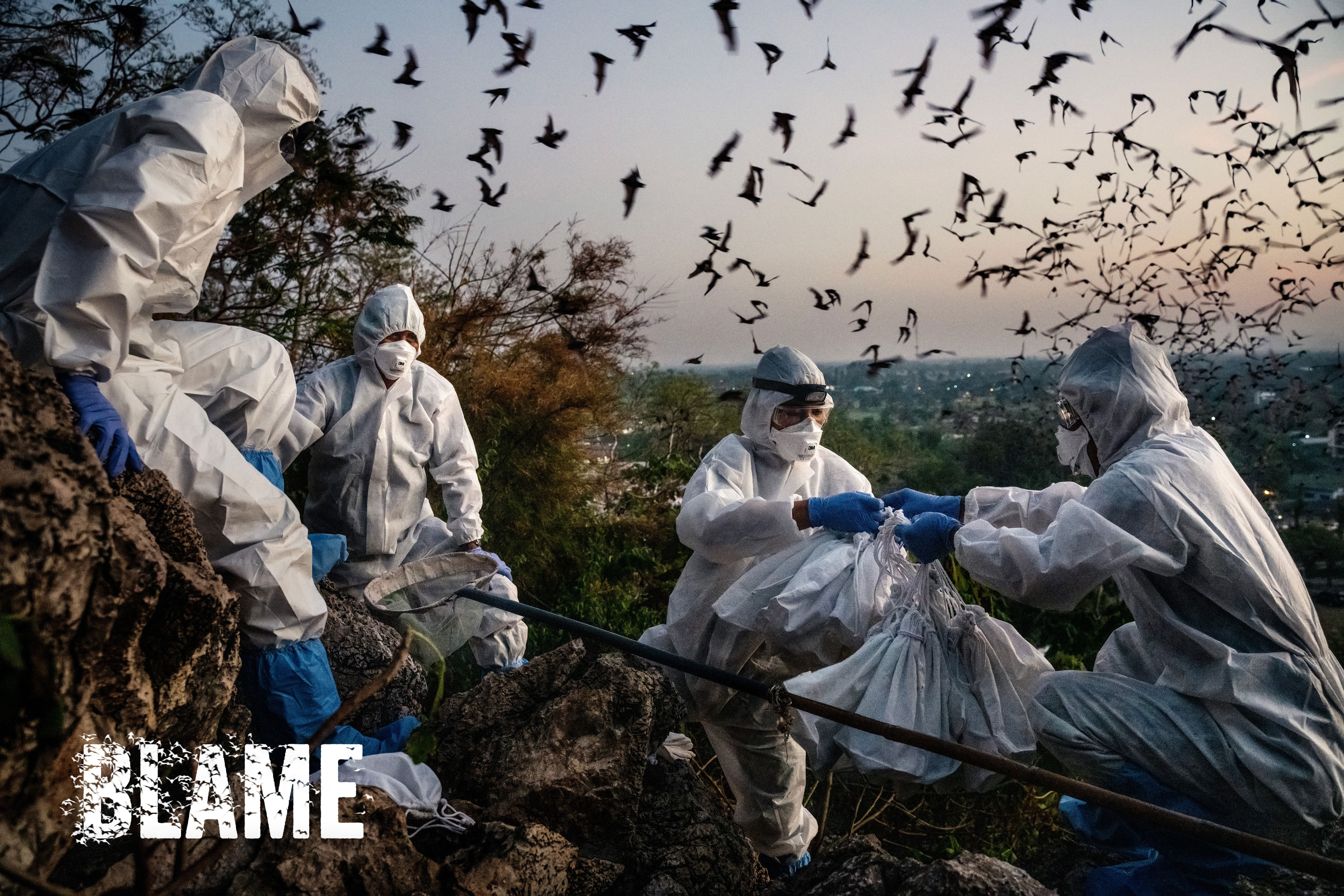
- Official film poster
- Directed by: Christian Frei
- Written by: Christian Frei, Trine Piil
- Produced by: Christian Frei
- Starring: Linfa Wang, Zhengli Shi, Peter Daszak, Philipp Markolin, Jane Qiu
- Cinematography: Filip Zumbrunn, Peter Indergand
- Edited by: Christian Frei, Magnus Langset
- Music by: Marcel Vaid, Jóhann Jóhannsson
- Production company: Christian Frei Filmproductions GmbH
- Distributed by: Rise and Shine World Sales
- Release date: April 4, 2025 (Visions du Réel)
- Running time: 123 minutes
- Country: Switzerland
- Language: English

Blame (Bats, Politics and a Planet Out of Balance) is a 2025 Swiss documentary film directed and produced by Christian Frei. The film investigates the origins of the COVID-19 pandemic by focusing on three prominent scientists: bat virus expert Linfa Wang, virologist Zhengli Shi, and zoologist Peter Daszak. It contrasts their scientific work with the political turmoil and conspiracy theories that emerged during the global health crisis. The feature-length film premiered on April 4, 2025, as the opening film of the 56th Visions du Réel International Film Festival in Nyon, Switzerland.

== Plot ==
The documentary follows three scientists—Linfa Wang in Singapore, Shi Zhengli in Wuhan, and Peter Daszak in New York—who were central to coronavirus research long before the COVID-19 pandemic. In 2003, they successfully traced the origins of the SARS outbreak to a bat cave in China and warned that a similar, more dangerous virus could emerge in the future.

When COVID-19 appears, their expertise is initially sought after, but they soon become targets of intense political scrutiny and public blame. The film juxtaposes the scientists' methodical, long-term research with the rapid and often volatile world of media headlines, political accusations, and social media speculation.

Director Christian Frei presents the narrative from the scientists' perspective, highlighting the personal and professional toll of being at the center of a global discussion on the "trust in empirical evidence." Frei's central thesis is summarized by his statement: “Those who warned us would eventually be the ones who are blamed.”

== Themes ==
A primary theme of the film is the conflict between the slow, rigorous process of scientific discovery and the demands of a fast-paced, politically charged media landscape. It explores how scientific uncertainty can be weaponized in political discourse and how complex realities are often flattened into simplistic, accusatory narratives. The documentary also examines the human tendency to seek out scapegoats during times of crisis, as reflected in its title. It delves into the mechanics of misinformation and the creation of conspiracy theories in the digital age, showing how narratives are "formed, amplified by politicians, and embraced by hostile media."

== Production ==
Director Christian Frei began his "cinematic journey" shortly after the COVID-19 outbreak began. Due to the geopolitical sensitivities surrounding the pandemic's origins, filming was conducted discreetly to protect both the locations and the participants.

Filming started in November 2022 at the 7th World One Health Congress in Singapore. The production crew traveled extensively through Southeast Asia, including to Thailand to document fieldwork at Wat Luang Phrommawat, a temple where scientists test fruit bats for the Nipah virus. Additional scenes were shot at Khao Chong Phran Cave in Ratchaburi Province, home to an estimated 2.8 million bats, and in the Pang Mapha of northern Thailand, known for its extensive cave systems.

The main cinematography was handled by Peter Indergand and Filip Zumbrunn, with a score composed by Marcel Vaid and additional music by Jóhann Jóhannsson. The 123-minute film was co-written by Trine Piil.

== Reception ==
Blame received generally positive reviews, with critics praising its investigative approach and cinematic quality.

Screen International called the film an "alarming" and "chilling depiction of the way narratives are formed," highlighting its relevance in an era of truth-twisting. Film critic Michael Sennhauser described the film as "a classic Christian Frei, a meticulously researched and visually powerful cinematic essay that maintains its balance even on the most slippery terrain." In The Observer, Mark Honigsbaum lauded the film for its compelling storytelling but expressed regret that it might not secure distribution in the UK or the US due to its controversial subject matter.

Selim Petersen of Swiss Radio and Television (SRF) noted the film's objectivity and praised the "evocative imagery" captured by cinematographers Peter Indergand and Filip Zumbrunn. Felix Straumann and Pascal Blum of Tages-Anzeiger noted that Frei "succeeds in making the complexity of the topic tangible" while tracing the origins of conspiracy theories.

Franziska Meister of the weekly newspaper WOZ praised the film for being "a lesson in the politics of science in a world out of balance." A more critical take came from Marcel Gyr of NZZ, who argued that the film lacked critical distance from its subjects, particularly Peter Daszak.

== Cast ==
- Linfa Wang as himself
- Zhengli Shi as herself
- Peter Daszak as himself
- Philipp Markolin as himself
- Jane Qiu as herself

== Awards and nominations ==
The film's festival run includes:

- Visions du Réel, Nyon, Switzerland – World Premiere, Opening Film (April 2025)
- International Contemporary Science Film Festival, Moscow, Winner Grand Prix Best International Documentary (April 2025)
- DOK.fest München, Munich, Germany – Nominated Viktoria DOK.International (May 2025)
- CinemAmbiente Festival, Turin – Winner Audience Award (June 2025)
- Doc Edge Festival, New Zealand – Winner In Truth We Trust Award (July 2025)
- International Festival Signes de Nuit - Bangkok – Winner International Competition (July 2025)
- Schweizer Filmpreis – Nomination in the category «Best Documentary» (January 2026)
- #LabMeCrazy! Science Film Festival – Winner Best Documentary (February 2026)
- Roman Brodmann Prize 2026 – Nomination (March 2026)
