= EcoHealth Alliance =

Non-governmental organization

- Abbreviation: EHA
- Dissolved: April 2025
- Type: 501(c)(3) organization
- Tax ID no.: 31-1726494
- Purpose: Pandemic prevention, Scientific research, One Health, Conservation
- Location: New York City, New York
- Region served: Worldwide
- Key people: Gerald Durrell (founder), Peter Daszak (former President), Noam Ross, Kevin Olival
- Website: ecohealthalliance.org at the Wayback Machine (archived November 20, 2025)
- Formerly called: Wildlife Trust

EcoHealth Alliance (EHA) was a US-based non-governmental organization with a stated mission of protecting people, animals, and the environment from emerging infectious diseases. The nonprofit organization focused on research aimed at preventing pandemics and promoting conservation in hotspot regions worldwide.

The EcoHealth Alliance focused on diseases caused by deforestation and increased interaction between humans and wildlife. The organization researched the emergence of diseases such as Severe Acute Respiratory Syndrome (SARS), Nipah virus, Middle East respiratory syndrome (MERS), Rift Valley fever, the Ebola virus, and COVID-19.

The EcoHealth Alliance also advised the World Organization for Animal Health (OIE), the International Union for Conservation of Nature (IUCN), the United Nations Food and Agriculture Organization (FAO), and the World Health Organization (WHO) on global wildlife trade, threats of disease, and the environmental damage posed by these.

Following the outbreak of the COVID-19 pandemic, EcoHealth's ties with the Wuhan Institute of Virology were put into question in relation to investigations into the origin of COVID-19. Citing these concerns, the National Institutes of Health (NIH) withdrew funding to the organization in April 2020. Significant criticism followed this decision, including a joint letter signed by 77 Nobel laureates and 31 scientific societies. The NIH later reinstated funding to the organization as one of 11 institutions partnering in the Centers for Research in Emerging Infectious Diseases (CREID) initiative in August 2020, but all activities funded by the grant remain suspended.

In 2022, the NIH terminated the EcoHealth Alliance grant, stating that "EcoHealth Alliance had not been able to hand over lab notebooks and other records from its Wuhan partner that relate to controversial experiments involving modified bat viruses, despite multiple requests." In 2023, an audit by the Office of Inspector General of the United States Department of Health and Human Services found that "NIH did not effectively monitor or take timely action to address" compliance problems with the EcoHealth Alliance. In December 2023, the EcoHealth Alliance denied allegations that it double-billed the NIH and United States Agency for International Development for research in China. In May 2024, the United States Department of Health and Human Services banned all federal funding for the EcoHealth Alliance. As of April 2026,EcoHealth Alliance has ceased operations.

== History ==
Founded under the name Wildlife Preservation Trust International in 1971 by British naturalist, author, and television personality, Gerald Durrell, it then became The Wildlife Trust in 1999. In the fall of 2010, the organization changed its name to EcoHealth Alliance. The rebrand reflected a change in the organization's ‘focus, moving solely from a conservation nonprofit, which focused mainly on the captive breeding of endangered species, to an environmental health organization with its foundation in conservation.

The organization held an early professional conservation medicine meeting in 1996. In 2002, they published an edited volume on the field through Oxford University Press: Conservation Medicine: Ecological Health in Practice.

In February 2008, they published a paper in Nature entitled "Global trends in emerging infectious diseases" which featured an early rendition of a global disease hotspot map. Using epidemiological, social, and environmental data from the past 50 years, the map outlined regions of the globe most at risk for emergent disease threats.

EcoHealth Alliance's funding came mostly from U.S. federal agencies such as the Department of Defense, Department of Homeland Security, and U.S. Agency for International Development. Between 2011 and 2020, its annual budget fluctuated between US$9 and US$15 million per year.

=== COVID-19 pandemic ===
Following the outbreak of the COVID-19 pandemic, EcoHealth Alliance was the subject of controversy and increased scrutiny due to its ties to the Wuhan Institute of Virology (WIV)—which has been at the center of speculation since early 2020 that SARS-CoV-2 may have escaped in a lab incident. Prior to the pandemic, EcoHealth Alliance was the only U.S.-based organization researching coronavirus evolution and transmission in China, where they partnered with the WIV, among others. EcoHealth Alliance president Peter Daszak co-authored a February 2020 letter in The Lancet condemning "conspiracy theories suggesting that COVID-19 does not have a natural origin". However, Daszak failed to disclose EcoHealth Alliance's ties to the WIV, which some observers noted as an apparent conflict of interest. In June 2021, The Lancet published an addendum in which Daszak disclosed his cooperation with researchers in China.

In April 2020, the NIH ordered EcoHealth Alliance to cease spending the remaining $369,819 from its current NIH grant at the request of the Trump administration, pressuring them by stating "it must hand over information and materials from the Chinese research facility to resume funding for suspended grant" in reference to the Wuhan Institute of Virology. The canceled grant was supposed to run through 2024. Funding from NIH resumed in August 2020 after an uproar from "77 U.S. Nobel laureates and 31 scientific societies".

Work conducted at the Wuhan Institute of Virology under an NIH grant to the EcoHealth Alliance has been at the center of political controversies during the pandemic. One such controversy centered on whether any experiments conducted under the grant could be accurately described as "gain-of-function" (GoF) research. NIH officials (including Anthony Fauci) unequivocally denied during 2020 congressional hearings that the EcoHealth Alliance had conducted GoF research with NIH funding.

In October 2021, the EcoHealth Alliance submitted a progress report detailing the results of a past experiment where some laboratory mice lost more weight than expected after being infected with a modified bat coronavirus. The NIH subsequently sent a letter to the congressional House Committee on Energy and Commerce describing this experiment, but did not refer to it as "gain-of-function." Whether such research qualifies as "gain-of-function" is a matter of considerable debate among relevant experts.

In May 2024, the United States Department of Health and Human Services banned all federal funding for the EcoHealth Alliance, saying that the EcoHealth Alliance did not properly monitor research activities at the WIV and failed to report on their high-risk experiments.

On January 17, 2025, the Department of Health and Human Services (HHS) issued formal, 5-year debarments for both Daszak and his group. EcoHealth Alliance had dismissed Daszak as president as of January 6, according to an HHS notice.

On August 18, 2026, former NIAID senior adviser David Morens pled guilty to an indictment that alleged that he and co-conspirators Peter Daszak and Gerald Keusch had attempted to conceal their communications about EcoHealth Alliance’s terminated bat coronavirus grant and COVID-19 origins narratives.

== Programs ==
=== PREDICT ===
EcoHealth Alliance partner with USAID on the PREDICT subset of USAID's EPT (Emerging Pandemic Threats) program. PREDICT seeks to identify which emerging infectious diseases are of the greatest risk to human health. Many of EcoHealth Alliance's international collaborations with in-country organizations and institutions fall under the PREDICT umbrella.

=== IDEEAL ===
IDEEAL (Infectious Disease Emergence and Economics of Altered Landscapes Program) attempts to investigate the impact of deforestation and land-use change on the risk of zoonoses in Sabah, Malaysia. This project focuses on the local palm oil industry in particular. The study also offers to the country's corporate leaders and policymakers long-term alternatives to large-scale deforestation. The program is headquartered at the Malaysian Development Health Research Unit (DHRU), which was developed in collaboration with the Malaysian University of Sabah.

=== Bat Conservation ===
A growing body of research indicates that bats are an important factor in both ecosystem health and disease emergence. A number of hypotheses have been proposed for the high number of zoonoses that have come from bat populations in recent decades. One group of researchers hypothesized "that flight, a factor common to all bats but to no other mammals, provides an intensive selective force for coexistence with viral parasites through a daily cycle that elevates metabolism and body temperature analogous to the fever response in other mammals. On an evolutionary scale, this host-virus interaction might have resulted in the large diversity of zoonotic viruses in bats, possibly through bat viruses adapting to be more tolerant of the fever response and less virulent to their natural hosts."

=== Project Deep Forest ===
According to the FAO (Food and Agriculture Organization), roughly 18 million acres of forest (roughly the size of Panama) are lost every year due to deforestation.

=== Project DEFUSE ===
Project DEFUSE was a rejected DARPA grant application, which proposed to sample bat coronaviruses from various locations in China and Southeast Asia. To evaluate whether bat coronaviruses might spill over into the human population, the grantees proposed to create chimeric coronaviruses which were mutated in different locations, before evaluating their ability to infect human cells in the laboratory. One proposed alteration was to modify bat coronaviruses to insert a cleavage site for the Furin protease at the S1/S2 junction of the spike (S) viral protein. Another part of the grant aimed to create noninfectious protein-based vaccines containing just the spike protein of dangerous coronaviruses. These vaccines would then be administered to bats in caves in southern China to help prevent future outbreaks. Co-investigators on the rejected proposal included Ralph Baric from UNC, Linfa Wang from Duke–NUS Medical School in Singapore, and Shi Zhengli from the Wuhan Institute of Virology.

== See also ==
- Durrell Wildlife Conservation Trust
- Wildlife Preservation Canada
