= Linfa Wang =

Linfa Wang is Professor and was the Director of the Emerging Infectious Diseases Programme at Duke-NUS Medical School, Singapore.

== Education and career ==
Wang earned his bachelor's degree at the East China Normal University in Shanghai in 1982 obtained his Ph.D. at the University of California, Davis in 1986.

Wang's early research was at the Monash Centre for Molecular Biology and Medicine and in 1990, he joined the Commonwealth Scientific and Industrial Research Organisation (CSIRO), at the Australian Animal Health Laboratory (AAHL), where he played a leading role in identifying bats as the natural host of the Severe Acute Respiratory Syndrome (SARS) virus.

In January 2020, Wang resigned as director of Duke's Emerging Infectious Disease program, effective September 2020. After the DARPA Defuse bid was leaked in September 2021, Wang said the idea for the furin cleavage site was Ralph S. Baric from the University of North Carolina.

Wang, Peter Daszak, and Shi Zhengli are three scientists featured in a 2025 documentary by Swiss filmmaker Christian Frei called Blame. The film focuses on how misinformation and conspiracy theories spread about the COVID-19 pandemic.

== Awards ==
- 2021: President’s Science Award
- 2022: Asian Scientist 100, Asian Scientist

== See also ==
- Shi Zhengli
