= Nature Reviews Neuroscience =

- Discipline: Neuroscience
- Language: English
- Edited by: Darran Yates

Publication details
- History: 2000–present
- Publisher: Nature Portfolio
- Frequency: Monthly
- Impact factor: 34.7 (2022)

Standard abbreviations
- ISO 4: Nat. Rev. Neurosci.

Indexing
- CODEN: NRNAAN
- ISSN: 1471-003X (print); 1471-0048 (web)
- LCCN: 2001227039
- OCLC no.: 45495476

Links
- Journal homepage; Online archive

Nature Reviews Neuroscience is a monthly peer-reviewed review journal published by Nature Portfolio. It was established in 2000. The editor-in-chief is Darran Yates.

== Abstracting and indexing ==
The journal is abstracted and indexed in:

- PubMed/MEDLINE
- Science Citation Index Expanded
- Scopus

According to the Journal Citation Reports, the journal has a 2021 impact factor of 38.755, ranking it 1st out of 274 journals in the category "Neurosciences".

== See also ==
- List of scientific journals
- Nature (journal)
- Category:Nature Research academic journals
