= Centre International de Recherche en Infectiologie =

Facility in Lyon, France

The Centre International de Recherche en Infectiologie is an academic and research institute based in Lyon, France.

== Synopsis ==
The CIRI is composed of 22 teams gathered behind one goal: the fight against infectious diseases (which is the second cause of death worldwide) by "promoting in-depth conceptual and technological advances through approaches that span from fundamental to clinical/applied research." The key areas of expertise of the CIRI teams are bacteriology, immunology and virology.

The CIRI contains a Biosafety Level 4 laboratory.

== History ==
The CIRI was created in 2013 by the Inserm, the CNRS, the ENS de Lyon and the Université Claude Bernard Lyon 1 in partnership with the Pasteur Institute, the Mérieux Foundation, the VetAgroSup and the Hospices Civils de Lyon.

A BSL-4 laboratory at the Wuhan Institute of Virology received significant and substantial support of the conceptual, engineering and logistical varieties from the CIRI. The WIV BSL-4 facility was commissioned in February 2015.
