= Jane Qiu =

Chinese science writer

- 邱瑾
- Other name: Qiū Jǐn
- Education: University of Essex; University of Glasgow; Hunter College; King's College London
- Occupation: Journalist
- Employer: Nature Reviews Neuroscience (2004–2006)

Jane Qiu (Chinese: 邱瑾; pinyin: Qiū Jǐn) is an independent science journalist based in Beijing, primarily focusing on geoscience and the environment.

== Education and career ==
Qiu earned first-class honours in biology from the University of Essex in 1993. She coauthored the book RNA Isolation and Analysis in 1994, and completed a PhD in cancer genetics in 1997, through the Beatson Institute for Cancer Research of the University of Glasgow. After postdoctoral research at Hunter College in New York City and the Centre for Neuroscience of King's College London, she dropped out of academia to become a science journalist. She became an editor for Nature Reviews Neuroscience in 2004 and then, in 2006, a freelance journalist.

== Recognition ==
Qiu earned a silver medal in the 2016 AAAS Kavli Science Journalism Awards, in the magazine writing category, for three stories in Nature on prediction and warning systems for earthquake-triggered landslides in Nepal, Chinese fossil hominids, and the interlinked ecological and social effects of climate change on the grasslands of Tibet. The Tibet story won the 2017 best feature award of the Association of British Science Writers, and a group of six of her stories, including the Nepal and Tibet stories, won second place in the 2016 Asian Environmental Journalism Awards for Environmental Journalist of the Year. Another of her stories, on ancient ice preserved in Tibet, won the 2017 Outstanding Enterprise Reporting award of the South Asian Journalists Association. She is a two-time winner of the EGU Science Journalism Fellowship of the European Geosciences Union, and has been a Knight Science Journalism Fellow at the Massachusetts Institute of Technology.
