= Dominic Dwyer =

Australian microbiologist

Professor Dominic Dwyer FAHMS

Personal details
- Born: Dominic E. Dwyer
- Occupation: Microbiologist

Dominic E. Dwyer is an Australian microbiologist and Clinical Professor of Medicine for Immunology and Infectious Diseases at The University of Sydney's School of Medicine. He came from Saint Joseph's College school, that is also located at Sydney, before going to university.

Dwyer trained in microbiology, studying virology and infectious diseases at Westmead Hospital’s Institute of Clinical Pathology and Medical Research in 1986, and graduated as a medical microbiologist in 1997.

On 2 December 2020, Dwyer was appointed to the 13 member team of the World Health Organization's investigation into the origins of COVID-19. He was elected a Fellow of the Australian Academy of Health and Medical Sciences in October 2022.
