= Angela Rasmussen =

American virologist and researcher

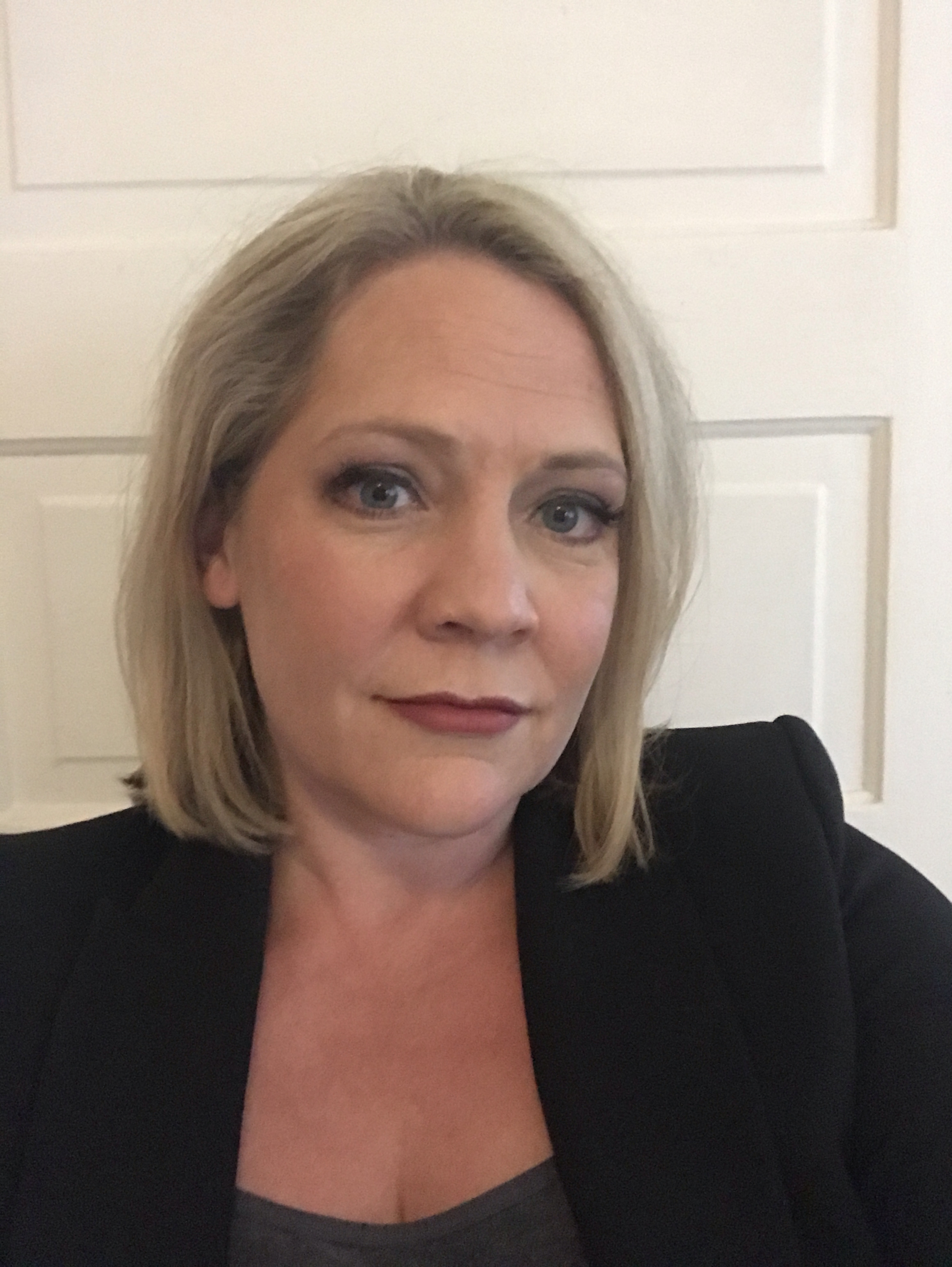
- Rasmussen in 2020
- Born: Angela Lynn Rasmussen
- Education: Smith College (BA, 2000); Columbia University (PhD, 2009)
- Spouse: Alexei Krasnoselsky
- Scientific career
- Fields: Virology
- Institutions: Columbia University; University of Washington; University of Saskatchewan
- Thesis: Development of a Mouse Model of Rhinovirus Infection (2009)
- Doctoral advisor: Vincent Racaniello
- Website: angelarasmussen.org

Angela Lynn Rasmussen is an American virologist at the Vaccine and Infectious Disease Organization at the University of Saskatchewan in Canada.

== Education and early career ==
During graduate school, Rasmussen worked in the laboratory of Vincent Racaniello, where she developed a mouse model of rhinovirus infection to better understand the pathogenesis of illnesses caused by the virus, such as the common cold. In 2008, she appeared as a guest on Racaniello's podcast This Week in Virology.

In 2014, Rasmussen was a contestant on Jeopardy!, an American trivia game show.

== Research ==
Rasmussen joined the faculty at Columbia University Mailman School of Public Health, where she worked as an associate research scientist. There, she studied how hosts respond to infectious diseases such as SARS and Ebola.

=== Ebolavirus research ===
During her tenure at University of Washington, she studied the response of mice to ebolavirus infection. The traditional mouse model, derived from a uniform genetic background, dies before the classical symptoms of the disease appear after infection, making it difficult to study the virus's pathogenesis. In order to study the pathogenenesis, Rasmussen and her team took advantage of a genetically diverse collection of mice, known as the Collaborative Cross, as the subjects of the research. When infecting this collection of mice with ebolavirus, they observed a wide range of disease outcomes, ranging from complete resistance to the virus to severe hemorrhagic fever. They concluded that the genetic background of the mice, therefore, plays a role in their susceptibility to the virus. By understanding which genes in mice affect the course of infection, researchers can better determine which genes make humans more susceptible to the disease—and why some humans die from an infection, while others survive.

Rasmussen continued work on understanding genetic susceptibility with Ebola at Columbia University. There, she identified a gene expression signature that may predict the severity of Ebola infection. Rasmussen and collaborators have also used human cell lines to investigate the course of infection. Upon infection, ebolavirus first targets macrophages, or white blood cells that engulf and clear away pathogens, which in turn release inflammatory cytokines that recruit more immune cells to the site of the infection to kill off infected tissue. If cytokine release goes unchecked it can lead to a profound inflammatory response—known as a cytokine storm—that can kill off healthy tissue, as is the case with an ebolavirus infection. She and collaborators found that inhibiting the inflammatory response of virus-infected macrophages could be a potential therapeutic target, preventing a cytokine storm from occurring.

=== COVID-19 work ===
Rasmussen's work investigating the heterogeneity in Ebola infections has translated into developing hypotheses around why some COVID-19 cases are worse than others.

She has also been on the frontlines of communication around the novel coronavirus and COVID-19, applying her expertise in correspondence with the popular press to interpret preliminary results around how long immunity to the virus may last, how effective potential drugs may be in treating the disease, and whether biological sex plays a role in the severity of the disease.

Given the breakneck pace at which preliminary research results have been released—for example, through preprints—she has urged caution in reporting research findings too quickly, without proper caveats, to ensure the public is not misinformed.

== Advocacy ==
Rasmussen has served on a National Institutes of Health working group on "Changing the Culture to End Sexual Harassment" in biomedical research fields. She formerly served on the leadership of the organization MeTooSTEM, before stepping down in February 2020 due to concerns with the organization's leadership and allegations of abuse.

== Publications ==
Rasmussen authors a Substack publication entitled, Rasmussen Retorts.
