= Stanley Perlman =

American microbiologist

- Education: University of Rochester; Massachusetts Institute of Technology; University of Miami School of Medicine
- Scientific career
- Fields: Microbiology; Immunology
- Institutions: University of Iowa
- Thesis: Mitochondrial protein synthesis in HeLa cells (1972)

Stanley Marc Perlman is an American microbiologist and coronavirus researcher. He is professor of microbiology and immunology, professor of pediatrics, and is a University of Iowa Distinguished Chair in the Roy J. and Lucille A. Carver College of Medicine at the University of Iowa. He has been researching coronaviruses for 38 years. He is a fellow of the American Academy of Microbiology and a member of the American Society for Microbiology.
