= Marion Koopmans =

Dutch virologist

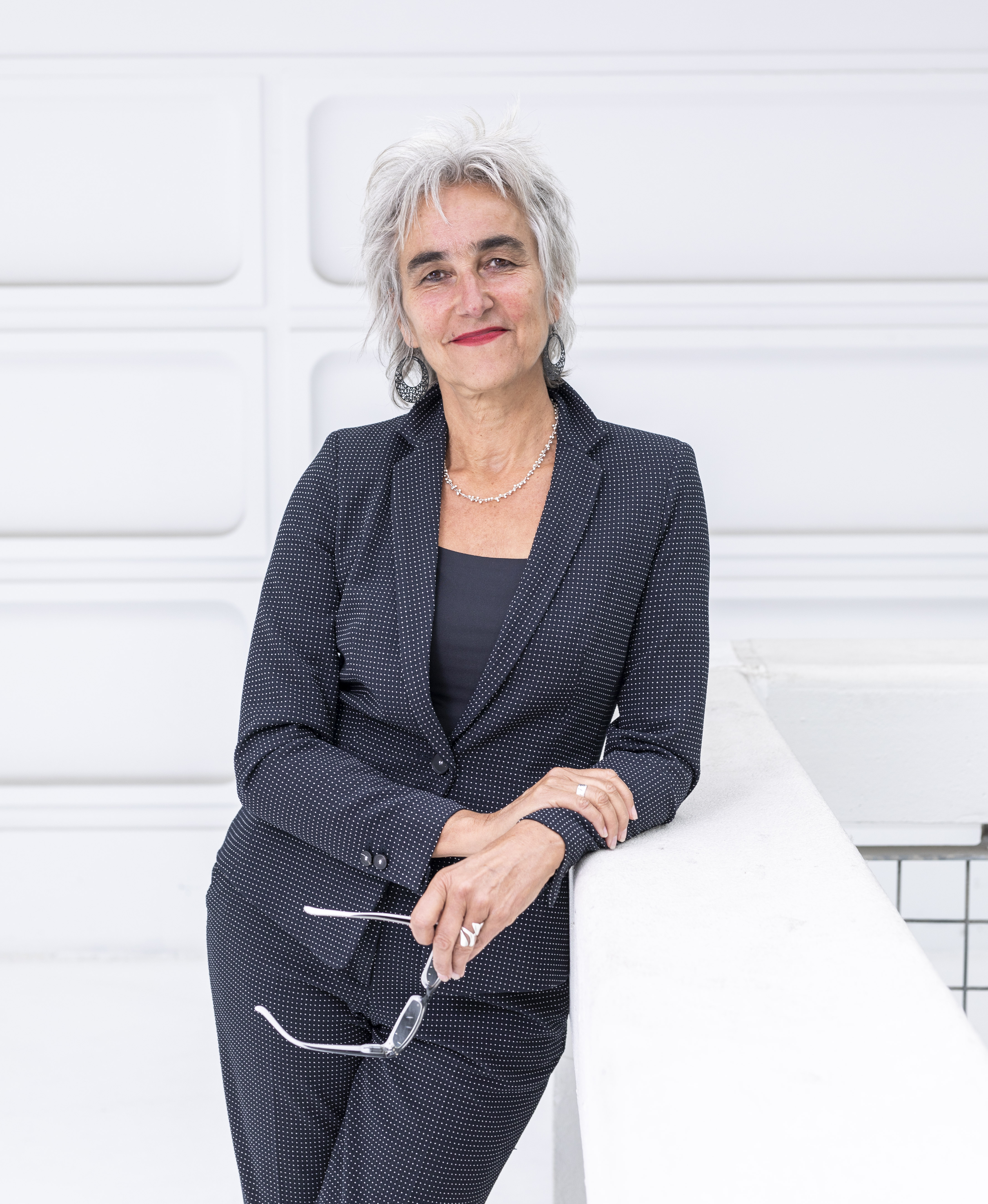
- Marion Koopmans
- Born: 21 September 1956 (age 69); Steyl (Venlo), Netherlands
- Education: Utrecht University
- Scientific career
- Workplaces: National Institute for Public Health and the Environment; Erasmus MC
- Thesis: Diagnosis and epidemiology of torovirus infections in cattle (1990)

Maria Petronella Gerarda Koopmans (born 21 September 1956) is a Dutch virologist who is Head of the Erasmus MC Department of Viroscience. Her research considers emerging infectious diseases, noroviruses and veterinary medicine. In 2018 she was awarded the Netherlands Organisation for Scientific Research (NWO) Stevin Prize. She serves on the scientific advisory group of the World Health Organization.

== Early life and education ==
Koopmans studied veterinary medicine at Utrecht University. She graduated from her Master's degree 1976, and remained there for her doctoral research. She earned two graduate degrees in veterinary medicine, and was officially registered as a veterinary microbiologist in 1977. She became increasingly interested in virology, and moved to the United States to specialise in viruses that can be transmitted between animals and humans. From 1991 to 1994 Koopmans completed a fellowship at the Centers for Disease Control and Prevention, where she studied enteric viruses.

== Research and career ==
Koopmans joined the National Institute for Public Health and the Environment (RIVM), where she was appointed Chief of Virology. She was involved with restructuring the department, and translating their research out of the laboratory and into practical applications for the control of infectious diseases. In 2006 she was appointed as Professor of Public Health at the Erasmus MC hospital in Rotterdam, which allowed her to strengthen the evidence-base of infectious disease research. Her laboratory makes use of basic scientific studies and epidemiology to understand the pathogenesis of infectious diseases, to establish their transmission routes and to translate this research base into diagnostic tools.

In 2003, when Influenza A virus subtype H7N7 spread around the Netherlands, Koopmans experienced her first infectious diseases outbreak. She was involved with the development of a coordinated public response, working with veterinarians and physicians to quickly develop public health policy. Her experiences in leading the response to the avian influenza outbreak prepared her for subsequent epidemics, including Middle East respiratory syndrome (MERS) and Zika virus. She was on the team that found, in 2013, that dromedary camels were an intermediate host for the virus that causes MERS. She has since worked with Elmoubasher Farag to test camels for antibodies against MERS.

During the Ebola outbreak in West Africa, Koopmans was responsible for the deployment of mobile laboratories in Sierra Leone and Liberia. Her Erasmus MC team trained volunteers to run testing and treatment programmes. Koopmans is a member of the scientific advisory group (SAG) of the World Health Organization's R&D Blueprint project. The project looks to understand what has gone wrong with epidemic and pandemic responses, and looks to build global disease preparedness. As part of this effort, Koopmans analysed the public health response to the Zika virus. She identified three significant bottlenecks to an efficient response; including delays in regulatory approvals, challenges in the logistics of laboratory support and the absence of a structured timeline for funding. Koopmans also leads the World Health Organization centre for Emerging Viral Diseases. She is the scientific coordinator of COMPARE, a Horizon 2020 project that looks to develop next generation sequencing techniques for outbreak identification and mapping. COMPARE look to contain and mitigate foodborne illnesses.

In 2018 Koopmans was honoured by the Netherlands Organisation for Scientific Research (NWO) for her work on the transfer of viruses from animals to humans. In 2019 she was awarded a $9 million NWO grant to establish a consortium, the Versatile Emerging infectious disease Observatory (VEO), that will study how changes in environment and travel will impact the risk of infectious diseases. The diseases considered by VEO include vector-borne and zoonotic diseases, as well as hidden pathogens. Koopmans wrote an article for Nature in which she called for a transformation in epidemic preparedness and response. In the article, she quoted the World Health Organization's leader on health emergencies, "We are entering a very new phase of high-impact epidemics… This is a new normal." In 2019 Koopmans was elected member of the Royal Netherlands Academy of Arts and Sciences.

From the start of 2020, Koopmans worked to understand SARS-CoV-2 and the spread of coronavirus disease. In the Netherlands, Koopmans made an effort to test healthcare workers, and identified that there were large numbers of asymptomatic carriers amongst the Dutch population. With her team at the Erasmus MC, Koopmans looked to understand the efficacy of antibody tests. Alongside leading the scientific response, Koopmans was also involved with scientific communication about the virus, making use of social media and media interviews to share up-to-date research with the public. Koopmans said that as humans occupied more of planet earth, the number of dangerous diseases transmitted from animals to humans would increase. She was appointed to the coronavirus disease advisory panel of the European Commission. The panel served to develop public health recommendations to the member states during the pandemic.

On 2 December 2020, Koopmans was appointed to the 13 member team of the World Health Organization's investigation into the origins of COVID-19.

== Science ==
Marion Koopmans is a member of the Royal Netherlands Academy of Arts and Sciences (KNAW) and the Royal Holland Society of Sciences (KHMW).

The Royal Netherlands Academy of Sciences is the forum, voice and conscience of science in the Netherlands. It is traditionally a society of excellent Dutch scientists. Members are elected on the basis of high-quality scientific achievements. Membership is for life. The Royal Holland Society of Sciences is a scientific society founded in 1752 in Haarlem.

== Machiavelli Prize - 2020 ==
The 2020 Machiavelli Prize has been awarded to Marion Koopmans and Diederik Gommers, president of the Dutch Society for Intensive Care. The prize is awarded annually for outstanding achievement in the field of public communication. Koopmans and Gommers received the 2020 award for their relentless efforts to make the science on coronavirus accessible to a wide audience. Deliberately seeking dialogue with doubters about the science and opponents of the policy, during the corona pandemic, helped increase understanding, especially among young people. Both Koopmans and Gommers have made it their vocation - in addition to their daily work in fighting the coronavirus, which is so urgent - to explain the coronavirus to a broad public.

== Iris Medal Science Communication - 2021 ==
Three science museums - NEMO Science Museum, Rijksmuseum Boerhaave and Teylers Museum - have created an award that rewards excellent science communication: the Iris Medal. The aim is to encourage original and effective forms of science communication. The €10,000 prize is awarded annually at the Evening of Science & Society. The prize money is made available by the KHMW. The prize was awarded to Robbert Dijkgraaf in 2019, Lowlands Science in 2020, Marion Koopmans in 2021 and University of the Netherlands in 2022.

== Establishment of Pandemic and Disaster Preparedness Center ==
The Pandemic & Disaster Preparedness Center (PDPC) was established in 2021. Marion Koopmans is initiator of this centre that aims to learn from the corona pandemic and better prepare society in the Netherlands (and beyond) for possible new pandemics but also disasters. Koopmans is scientific director of this centre.

== Awards and honours ==
- 2004 Nederlandse Vereniging voor Infectieziekten W.R.O. Goslingsprijs
- 2017 Technical University of Denmark Honorary Doctorate Æresdoktor
- 2018 Netherlands Organisation for Scientific Research Stevin Prize
- 2020 Machiavelli Prize
- 2021 Irispenning

== Selected publications ==
- Fouchier RA, Schneeberger PM, Rozendaal FW, Broekman JM, Kemink SA, Munster V, Kuiken T, Rimmelzwaan GF, Schutten M, Van Doornum GJ, Koch G, Bosman A, Koopmans M, Osterhaus AD (3 February 2004). "Avian influenza A virus (H7N7) associated with human conjunctivitis and a fatal case of acute respiratory distress syndrome". Proceedings of the National Academy of Sciences of the United States of America. 101 (5): 1356–61. Bibcode:2004PNAS..101.1356F. doi:10.1073/pnas.0308352100. OCLC 929966166. PMC 337057. PMID 14745020.
- Newell, Diane G.; Koopmans, Marion; Verhoef, Linda; Duizer, Erwin; Aidara-Kane, Awa; Sprong, Hein; Opsteegh, Marieke; Langelaar, Merel; Threfall, John; Scheutz, Flemming; der Giessen, Joke van (30 May 2010). "Food-borne diseases — The challenges of 20years ago still persist while new ones continue to emerge". International Journal of Food Microbiology. Future Challenges to Microbial Food Safety. 139: S3–S15. doi:10.1016/j.ijfoodmicro.2010.01.021. ISSN 0168-1605. PMC 7132498. PMID 20153070.
- Koopmans, Marion; Duizer, Erwin (1 January 2004). "Foodborne viruses: an emerging problem". International Journal of Food Microbiology. 90 (1): 23–41. doi:10.1016/s0168-1605(03)00169-7. ISSN 0168-1605. PMC 7127053. PMID 14672828.
- "The Novel Coronavirus Outbreak: What We Know and What We Don't". Cell. 180 (6): 1034–1036. 19 March 2020. doi:10.1016/j.cell.2020.02.027. ISSN 0092-8674. PMC 7154513. PMID 32078801.
