= Richard H. Ebright =

American molecular biologist

- Born: Richard High Ebright; June 11, 1959 (age 67)
- Education: Harvard University (BA, PhD)
- Awards: Searle Scholar Award (1989), National Institutes of Health MERIT Award (2013)
- Scientific career
- Fields: Molecular biology
- Workplaces: Rutgers University; Waksman Institute of Microbiology
- Thesis: Structure-function studies with the catabolite gene activator protein (CAP) of Escherichia coli (1986)

Richard High Ebright is an American molecular biologist. He is the Board of Governors Professor of Chemistry and Chemical Biology at Rutgers University and laboratory director at the Waksman Institute of Microbiology.

== Early life and education ==
Ebright received a Bachelor of Arts degree, summa cum laude, in biology in 1981 and his Ph.D. in microbiology and molecular genetics from Harvard University in 1987. He was a junior fellow of the Harvard Society of Fellows from 1984 to 1987.

== Career ==
Ebright was appointed as a faculty member in the Department of Chemistry at Rutgers University and as a Laboratory Director at the Waksman Institute of Microbiology in 1987. He was co-appointed as an Investigator of the Howard Hughes Medical Institute from 1997 to 2013.

Ebright's research has included the experimental demonstration that amino-acid-base contacts mediate DNA sequence recognition in protein-DNA interaction, the determination of the three-dimensional structural organization of the transcription initiation complex; the demonstration that transcription start-site selection and initial transcription involve "DNA scrunching", the demonstration that transcription activation can proceed by a "recruitment" mechanism, the demonstration that bacterial transcription-translation coupling involves direct physical bridging of RNA polymerase and a ribosome by NusA and NusG, the demonstration that bacterial Rho-dependent transcription termination involves the molecular-motor activity of the termination factor Rho, the demonstration that archaeal FttA-dependent transcription termination involves the endoribonuclease and exoribonuclease activities of the termination factor FttA, and the identification of novel antibacterial drug targets in bacterial RNA polymerase.

In 1994, Ebright was awarded the American Society of Biochemistry and Molecular Biology Schering-Plough Award for his research on transcription activation. In 1995, he received the Academic Press Walter J. Johnson Prize. In 2013, he received a National Institutes of Health MERIT Award. He was elected as a Fellow of the American Academy of Microbiology in 1996, the American Association for the Advancement of Science in 2004, the Infectious Diseases Society of America in 2011, and the American Academy of Arts and Sciences in 2016. He is featured in a high school textbook published by NCERT (recommended by the CBSE) in India, in a piece titled 'The Making of a Scientist,' which is adapted from an article of the same name written by Robert W. Peterson for Boy's Life magazine.

He has opposed the proliferation of laboratories working on biological weapons agents and has supported the strengthening of biosafety and biosecurity measures to reduce risks of release of biological weapons.

== COVID-19 origins ==
Ebright has stated that the genome and properties of SARS-CoV-2 provide no basis to conclude the virus was engineered as a bioweapon, but he also has stated that the possibility that the virus entered humans through a laboratory accident cannot be dismissed and has called for a thorough investigation of the origin of the pandemic and for measures to reduce the risk of future pandemics.

Ebright has accused NIAID director Anthony Fauci, NIH director Francis Collins and deputy director Lawrence Tabak of "lying to the public", about their past and continuing denials of NIH funding having been utilized for gain-of-function research experiments at the Wuhan Institute of Virology.

Ebright and fellow Rutgers University professor Bryce Nickels, who founded the non-profit advocacy group Biosafety Now with Ebright, have been vocal proponents of the COVID-19 lab leak theory. The Los Angeles Times's Michael Hiltzik has said that Ebright has "been posting online insinuations or accusations" of fraud, perjury, and murder regarding scientists that have supported a zoonotic origin of COVID-19 and dismissed the lab leak theory. Ebright has compared Fauci to Cambodian leader Pol Pot and claimed that Fauci's actions "likely killed 20 million people" and wrote that Peter Daszak was the author of a grant that "many people consider" to be the "‘Blueprint’ for SARS-CoV2". In 2024, Ebright was the subject of a formal complaint to Rutgers by 12 researchers, some of whom said that Ebright was engaging in defamation and intimidation against them for their research that found a zoonotic origin of COVID-19 to be the most likely origin and found the lab leak to be "implausible". In response, Ebright said that the complaint misrepresented him, and that he had never "threatened or incited violence against any of the signatories" and in response to the letter he referred to the signatories of the letter as "provably coauthors of fraudsters and perjurers", claiming that the letter was "a crude effort to silence their opponents and, thereby, to prop up their collapsing narrative."
