= Ralph S. Baric =

American researcher and epidemiologist

- Born: 1954 (age 71–72)
- Education: North Carolina State University
- Scientific career
- Fields: Epidemiology
- Workplaces: University of North Carolina at Chapel Hill
- Thesis: Inhibitors of host transcription block Sindbis virus replication (1982)
- Doctoral advisor: Robert E. Johnston
- Doctoral students: Lisa Ellen Hensley

Ralph Steven Baric (born 1954) is an American epidemiologist. He is the William R. Kenan Jr. Distinguished Professor in the Department of Epidemiology, and professor in the Department of Microbiology and Immunology at the University of North Carolina at Chapel Hill.

Baric's work involves coronaviruses, including gain of function research aimed at devising effective vaccines against coronaviruses. Baric has warned of emerging coronaviruses presenting as a significant threat to global health, due to zoonosis. Baric's work has drawn criticism from some scientists and members of the public related to chimeric virus experiments conducted at UNC-Chapel Hill.

== Career ==
Baric has published multiple articles and book chapters on the epidemiology and genetics of various viruses, including norovirus, and coronaviruses, as well as potential treatments for viral diseases.

In 2020, Baric contributed to establishing the official nomenclature and taxonomic classification of SARS-CoV-2. In 2021, he was elected member of the U. S. National Academy of Sciences.

=== Research and funding controversy ===
In 2015, with Shi Zhengli of the Wuhan Institute of Virology, he published an article titled "A SARS-like cluster of circulating bat coronaviruses shows potential for human emergence," which describes their work in generating and characterizing a chimeric virus which added the spike of a bat coronavirus (SHC014) onto the backbone of a mouse-adapted SARS-CoV (rMA15). The research related to this article drew criticism from other scientists due to fears that the SHC014-rMA15 chimeric virus could have pandemic potential. This concern was renewed and echoed by members of the public during the COVID-19 pandemic. Experts have noted that the virus was adapted to a mouse model and had decreased virulence in human tissues. The chimeric virus was also less virulent than the wild type rMA15 virus, as is expected in most chimeras.

Baric's pay from federal National Institutes of Health (NIH) grants was frozen in April 2025, following the re-election of Donald Trump, and he was placed on administrative leave from UNC until January 2026. The Department of Health and Human Services (HHS) suspended Baric in May 2026 from receiving funding over his coronavirus research in 2014, alleging he helped create a dangerous virus that had a "gain of function" and threatened human health. Baric was again placed on administrative leave. He described the accusation as "bullshit", believing it stemmed from unproven allegations that he helped engineer SARS-CoV-2, and added that those coronavirus experiments did not involve gain of function research. Though the suspension letter from HHS does not mention SARS-CoV-2 nor allege that Baric helped engineer the virus, in his 2023 book The Wuhan Cover-Up HHS Secretary Robert F. Kennedy Jr. attempted to link Baric's research to the COVID-19 pandemic.

== Selected publications ==
- Menachery, Vineet; Yount, Boyd L.; Debbink, Kari; et al. (2015). "A SARS-like cluster of circulating bat coronaviruses shows potential for human emergence". Nature medicine. 21 (12): 1508–1513. doi:10.1038/nm.3985. PMC 4797993. PMID 26552008. S2CID 5953778. Wikidata Q36702376. (Erratum: doi:10.1038/nm0416-446d, PMC 7095988, PMID 27050591, Wikidata Q56781330)
- Gorbalenya, Alexander E.; Baker, Susan; Drosten, Christian Heinrich Maria; et al. (2020). "The species Severe acute respiratory syndrome-related coronavirus: classifying 2019-nCoV and naming it SARS-CoV-2". Nature Microbiology. 5 (4): 536–544. doi:10.1038/s41564-020-0695-z. PMC 7095448. PMID 32123347. S2CID 211729429. Wikidata Q87000965.
- Anderson, Evan; Rouphael, Nadine G.; Widge, Alicia T.; et al. (2020). "Safety and Immunogenicity of SARS-CoV-2 mRNA-1273 Vaccine in Older Adults". The New England Journal of Medicine. doi:10.1056/nejmoa2028436. PMC 7556339. PMID 32991794. Wikidata Q100381659.
