= Wuhan Institute of Virology =

Research Institute in Wuhan, Hubei, China

- 中国科学院武汉病毒研究所

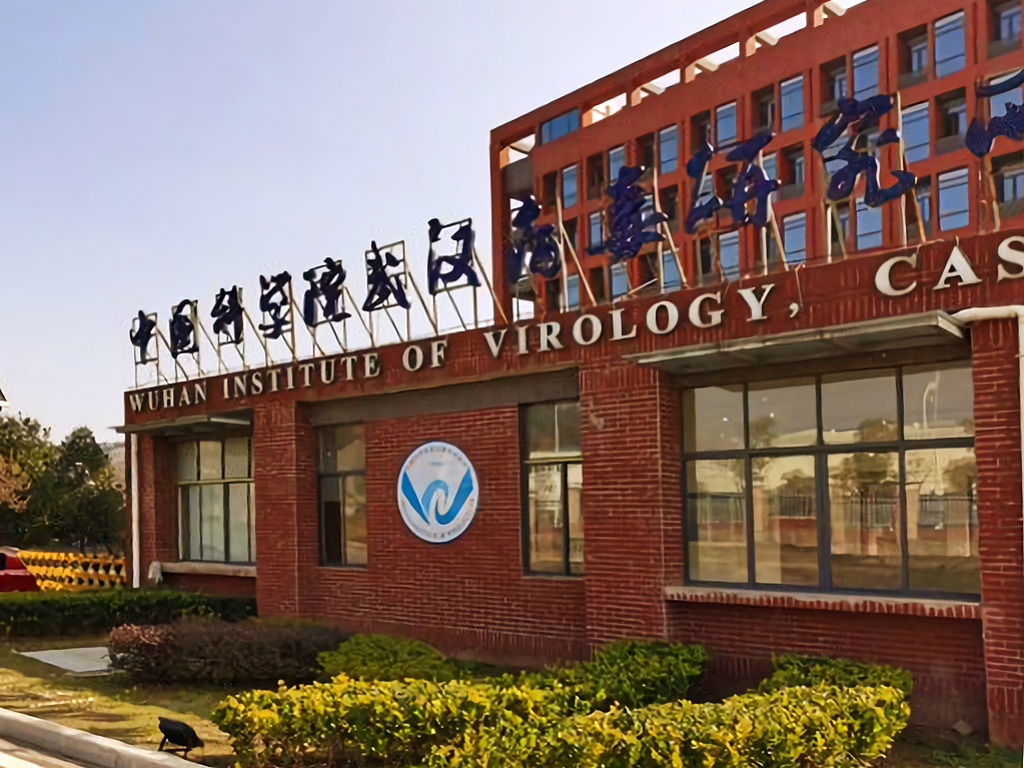
- Abbreviation: WIV
- Predecessor: Wuhan Microbiology Laboratory; South China Institute of Microbiology; Wuhan Microbiology Institute; Microbiology Institute of Hubei Province
- Formation: 1956
- Founder: Chen Huagui, Gao Shangyin
- Headquarters: Xiaohongshan, Wuchang District, Wuhan, Hubei, China
- Coordinates: 30°22′35″N 114°15′45″E
- Director-General: Wang Yanyi
- Party Committee Secretary: Xiao Gengfu
- Deputy Director-General: Gong Peng, Guan Wuxiang, Xiao Gengfu
- Parent organization: Chinese Academy of Sciences
- Staff: 295 (2014)
- Website: english.whiov.cas.cn

Wuhan Institute of Virology
- Simplified Chinese: 中国科学院武汉病毒研究所
- Traditional Chinese: 中國科學院武漢病毒研究所
Transcriptions
Standard Mandarin
- Hanyu Pinyin: Zhōngguó Kēxuéyuàn Wǔhàn Bìngdú Yánjiūsuǒ

The Wuhan Institute of Virology, Chinese Academy of Sciences (WIV; Chinese: 中国科学院武汉病毒研究所) is a virology research institute under the Wuhan Branch of the Chinese Academy of Sciences. Located in Jiangxia District, Wuhan, Hubei, it was founded in 1956 and opened mainland China's first biosafety level 4 (BSL-4) laboratory in 2018. The institute has collaborated with the Galveston National Laboratory in the United States, the Centre International de Recherche en Infectiologie in France, and the National Microbiology Laboratory in Canada. The institute has been an active premier research center for the study of coronaviruses.

== History ==
The WIV was founded in 1956 as the Wuhan Microbiology Laboratory under the Chinese Academy of Sciences (CAS). It was established by scientists Gao Shangyin, a graduate of Soochow University (Suzhou), and Chen Huagui. In 1961, it became the South China Institute of Microbiology, and in 1962 was renamed Wuhan Microbiology Institute. In 1970, it became the Microbiology Institute of Hubei Province when the Hubei Commission of Science and Technology took over the administration. In June 1978, it was returned to the CAS and renamed Wuhan Institute of Virology.

In 2003, the Chinese academy of Sciences approved the construction of mainland China's first (Note: As of February 2017, there were already two BSL-4 labs in Taiwan.) biosafety level 4 (BSL-4) laboratory at the WIV. In 2014, the WIV's National Bio-safety Laboratory was built at a cost of 300 million yuan (US$44 million), in collaboration and with assistance from the French government's CIRI lab. The new laboratory building has 3,000 m^{2} (32,000 sq ft) of BSL-4 space, and also 20 BSL-2 and two BSL-3 laboratories. The BSL-4 facilities were accredited by the China National Accreditation Service for Conformity Assessment (CNAS) in January 2017, with the BSL-4 level lab put into operation in January 2018. The highest level biosafety installation is necessary because the institute investigates highly dangerous viruses, such as SARS, influenza H5N1, Japanese encephalitis, and dengue.

The National Bio-safety Laboratory has strong ties to the Galveston National Laboratory in the University of Texas. It also had ties with Canada's National Microbiology Laboratory until WIV staff scientists Xiangguo Qiu and her husband Keding Cheng, who were also remunerated by the Canadian government, were escorted from the Canadian lab for undisclosed reasons in July 2019. Researchers from the WIV have, in the past, collaborated with international scientists in the creation of chimeric coronavirus. Some researchers (notably Richard Ebright) believe this work falls under the definition of gain of function research, but many other experts dispute this classification.

Safety precautions were taken into consideration when building the Wuhan lab. The lab was built far away from any flood plain. It was also built to withstand a magnitude-7 earthquake, even though the region has no history of earthquakes. Many Wuhan lab staff were trained at a BSL-4 lab in Lyon, France. Researchers were also trained in Australia, Canada, the United States and then in-house before the lab was operational. Scientists such as U.S. molecular biologist Richard H. Ebright, who had expressed concern of previous escapes of the SARS virus at Chinese laboratories in Beijing and had been troubled by the pace and scale of China's plans for expansion into BSL-4 laboratories, called the institute a "world-class research institution that does world-class research in virology and immunology" while he noted that the WIV is a world leader in the study of bat coronaviruses.

== Coronavirus research ==
=== SARS-related coronaviruses ===
In 2005, a group including researchers from the Wuhan Institute of Virology published research into the origin of the SARS coronavirus, finding that China's horseshoe bats are natural reservoirs of SARS-like coronaviruses. Continuing this work over a period of years, researchers from the institute sampled thousands of horseshoe bats in locations across China, isolating over 300 bat coronavirus sequences.

In 2015, an international team including two scientists from the institute published successful research on whether a bat coronavirus could be made to infect a human cell line (HeLa). The team engineered a hybrid virus, combining a bat coronavirus with a SARS virus that had been adapted to grow in mice and mimic human disease. The hybrid virus was able to infect human cells.

In 2017, a team from the institute announced that coronaviruses found in horseshoe bats at a cave in Yunnan contain all the genetic pieces of the SARS virus, and hypothesized that the direct progenitor of the human virus originated in this cave. The team, who spent five years sampling the bats in the cave, noted the presence of a village only a kilometer away, and warned of "the risk of spillover into people and emergence of a disease similar to SARS".

In 2018, another paper by a team from the institute reported the results of a serological study of a sample of villagers residing near these bat caves (near Xiyang Township 夕阳乡 in Jinning District of Yunnan). According to this report, 6 out of the 218 local residents in the sample carried antibodies to the bat coronaviruses in their blood, indicating the possibility of transmission of the infections from bats to people.

Prior to and throughout the COVID-19 pandemic, coronavirus research at the WIV has been conducted in BSL-2 and BSL-3 laboratories.

=== COVID-19 pandemic ===
In December 2019, cases of pneumonia associated with an unknown coronavirus were reported to health authorities in Wuhan. The institute checked its coronavirus collection and found the new virus had 96% genetic similarity to RaTG13, a virus its researchers had discovered in horseshoe bats in southwest China.

As the virus spread worldwide, the institute continued its investigation. In February 2020, a team led by Shi Zhengli at the institute were the first to identify, analyze and name the genetic sequence of the novel coronavirus (2019-nCoV), upload it to public databases for scientists around the world to understand, and publish papers in Nature. On 19 February 2020, the lab released a letter on its website describing how they successfully obtained the whole virus genome. In February 2020, in a move that raised concerns regarding intellectual property rights, the institute applied for a patent in China for the use of remdesivir, an experimental drug owned by Gilead Sciences, which the institute found inhibited the virus in vitro. The WIV said it would not exercise its new Chinese patent rights "if relevant foreign companies intend to contribute to the prevention and control of China's epidemic."

In April 2020, the Trump administration terminated an NIH grant to research how coronaviruses spread from bats to humans. New York-based, NIH–funded EcoHealth Alliance has been the subject of controversy and increased scrutiny due to its ties to the Wuhan Institute of Virology. Under political pressure, the National Institutes of Health (NIH) withdrew funding to EcoHealth Alliance in July 2020.

Ralph Baric and Rachel Graham wrote in 2020 that the large collections of bat virome samples stored at the facility, its close proximity to the early outbreak, and questions about its operating procedures, could fuel "speculation" about the institute's role in the origin of COVID-19.

== Virus speculations criticism ==
The laboratory has been the focus of conspiracy theories and unsubstantiated speculation about the origin of the virus. This has been a source of political tension between China and other countries, including Australia and the United States. There have been allegations that the initial outbreak was provoked by either manipulation or accidental release of a virus held in the WIV facilities, and that the participants may have conspired to cover it up. Shi Zhengli denied that there was a connection between the WIV and the emergence of COVID-19. In February 2021, after investigations in Wuhan, the WHO team said a laboratory leak origin for COVID-19 was "extremely unlikely", confirming what experts expected about the likely origins and early transmission. However, WHO Director-General Tedros Adhanom Ghebreyesus said that the report's conclusions were not definitive and data had been withheld from investigators. In response to the report, politicians, including Joe Biden and Boris Johnson, as well as Ghebreyesus, have called for further investigations into the origins of COVID-19. The scientific opinion that an accidental leak is possible, but unlikely, has remained steady.

== Research centers ==
The Institute contains the following research centers:

- Center for Emerging Infectious Disease
- Chinese Virus Resources and Bioinformatics Center
- Center of Applied and Environmental Microbiology
- Department of Analytical Biochemistry and Biotechnology
- Department of Molecular Virology

== See also ==
- Chinese Center for Disease Control and Prevention
- Investigations into the origin of COVID-19
- Scientific Advisory Group for Origins of Novel Pathogens
- Zoonosis
