= Chimera (virus) =

Virus with genetic material derived from multiple different viruses

A chimera or chimeric virus is a virus that contains genetic material derived from two or more distinct viruses. It is defined by the Center for Veterinary Biologics (part of the U.S. Department of Agriculture's Animal and Plant Health Inspection Service) as a "new hybrid microorganism created by joining nucleic acid fragments from two or more different microorganisms in which each of at least two of the fragments contain essential genes necessary for replication." The term genetic chimera had already been defined to mean an individual organism whose body contained cell populations from different zygotes. Chimeric flaviviruses have been created in an attempt to make novel live attenuated vaccines.

== Etymology ==
In mythology, a chimera is a creature such as a hippogriff or a gryphon formed from parts of different animals, thus the name for these viruses.

== As a natural phenomenon ==
Viruses are categorized in two types: In prokaryotes, the great majority of viruses possess double-stranded (ds) DNA genomes, with a substantial minority of single-stranded (ss) DNA viruses and only limited presence of RNA viruses. In contrast, in eukaryotes, RNA viruses account for the majority of the virome diversity although ssDNA and dsDNA viruses are common as well.

In 2012, the first example of a naturally occurring RNA-DNA hybrid virus was unexpectedly discovered during a metagenomic study of the acidic extreme environment of Boiling Springs Lake that is in Lassen Volcanic National Park, California. The virus was named BSL-RDHV (Boiling Springs Lake RNA DNA Hybrid Virus). Its genome is related to a DNA circovirus, which usually infect birds and pigs, and a RNA tombusvirus, which infect plants. The study surprised scientists, because DNA and RNA viruses vary and the way the chimera came together was not understood.

Other viral chimeras have also been found, and the group is known as the CHIV viruses ("chimeric viruses").

== As a bioweapon ==
Combining two pathogenic viruses increases the lethality of the new virus which is why there have been cases where chimeric viruses have been considered for use as a bioweapon. For example, the Soviet Union's Chimera Project attempted in the late 1980s and early 1990s to combine DNA from Venezuelan equine encephalitis virus and Smallpox virus at one location, and Ebola virus and Smallpox virus in another location, even in the face of Boris Yeltsin's decree of 11 April 1992.

A combination Smallpox virus and Monkeypox virus has also been studied.

== As a medical treatment ==
Studies are in progress to create a chimeric vaccine against four types of Dengue virus, however this has not been successful yet.
