= SARS =

Severe acute respiratory syndrome

Severe acute respiratory syndrome (SARS)
- Other names: Sudden acute respiratory syndrome
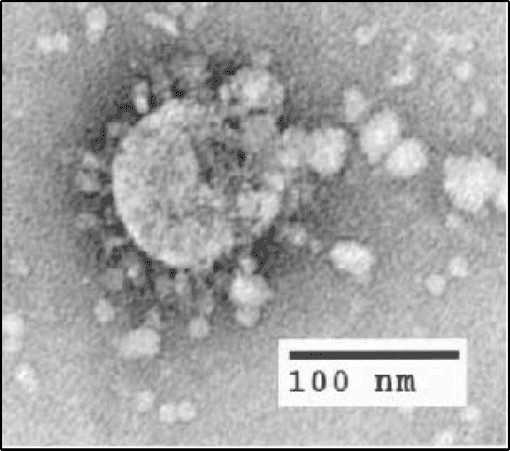
- Electron micrograph of SARS coronavirus virion
- Pronunciation: /sɑːrz/
- Specialty: Infectious disease
- Symptoms: Fever, persistent dry cough, headache, muscle pains, difficulty breathing
- Complications: Acute respiratory distress syndrome (ARDS) with other comorbidities that eventually leads to death
- Usual onset: 4–6 days post-exposure
- Causes: Severe acute respiratory syndrome coronavirus (SARS-CoV-1)
- Prevention: N95 or FFP2 respirators, ventilation, UVGI, avoiding travel to affected areas
- Prognosis: 9.5% chance of death (all countries)
- Frequency: 8,096 total confirmed cases (2002–2004), no new cases since 2004
- Deaths: 783 known (Particularly in Asia)

Severe acute respiratory syndrome (SARS) is a viral respiratory disease of zoonotic origin caused by the virus SARS-CoV-1, the first identified strain of the SARS-related coronavirus. The first known cases occurred in November 2002, and the syndrome caused the 2002–2004 SARS outbreak. In the 2010s, Chinese scientists traced the virus through the intermediary of Asian palm civets to cave-dwelling horseshoe bats in Xiyang Yi Ethnic Township, Yunnan.

SARS was a relatively rare disease; at the end of the epidemic in June 2003, the incidence was 8,422 cases with a case fatality rate (CFR) of 11%. No cases of SARS-CoV-1 have been reported worldwide since 2004.

In December 2019, a second strain of SARS-CoV was identified: SARS-CoV-2. This strain causes coronavirus disease 2019 (COVID-19), the disease behind the COVID-19 pandemic.

== Signs and symptoms ==
SARS produces flu-like symptoms which may include fever, muscle pain, lethargy, cough, sore throat, and other nonspecific symptoms. SARS often leads to shortness of breath and pneumonia, which may be direct viral pneumonia or secondary bacterial pneumonia.

The average incubation period for SARS is four to six days, although it is rarely as short as one day or as long as 14 days.

== Transmission ==
The primary route of transmission for SARS-CoV is contact of the mucous membranes with respiratory droplets or fomites. As with all respiratory pathogens once presumed to transmit via respiratory droplets, it is highly likely to be carried by the aerosols generated during routine breathing, talking, and even singing. While diarrhea is common in people with SARS, the fecal–oral route is another mode of transmission. The basic reproduction number of SARS-CoV, R_{0}, ranges from 2 to 4 depending on different analyses.

== Diagnosis ==
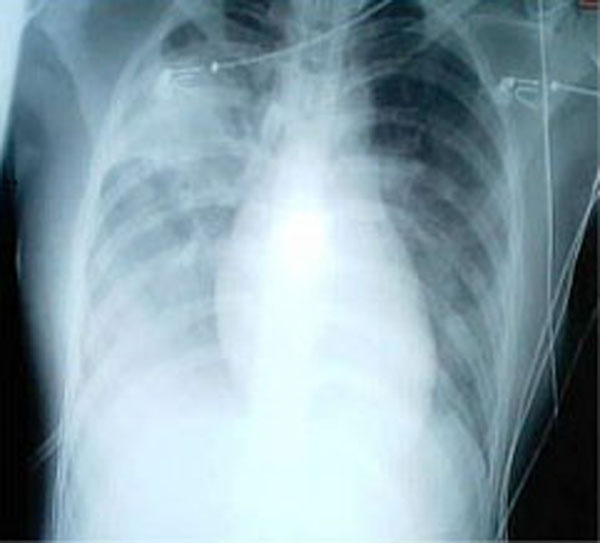
A chest X-ray showing increased opacity in both lungs, indicative of pneumonia, in a patient with SARS

SARS-CoV may be suspected in a patient who has:

- Traveled to China or Taiwan or has been in close contact with an ill person from those areas,
- A laboratory worker or a healthcare in contact with a laboratory worker in contact with live SARS-COV-1 virus,
- A patient with atypical pneumonia and no alternative diagnosis.

The appearance of SARS-CoV in chest X-rays is not always uniform but generally appears as an abnormality with patchy infiltrates.

== Prevention ==
In 2017 immunologist Anthony Fauci said the CDC had developed a vaccine for SARS-COV-1 and placed it in the Strategic National Stockpile. The vaccine was not deployed because public health measures defeated the outbreak. A vaccine developed by a team led by Peter Hotez sits in a freezer at the University of Texas.

To prevent the spread of SARS in a hospital setting, detection and strict clinical isolation is combined with droplet and contact contamination prevention measures through the use of personal protective equipment. Tracing and quarantine of people who contact infected individuals is effective in preventing the spread in the community.

Public health measures ended the 2002 SARS outbreak. No cases have been reported since 2004. Precautions recommended should an outbreak reoccur include:

- Hand-washing with soap and water, or use of alcohol-based hand sanitizer
- Wearing masks and gloves
- Washing the personal items of someone with SARS in hot, soapy water (eating utensils, dishes, bedding, etc.)
- Disinfect any surfaces which may have come in contact with any bodily fluids of an infected person.

A 2017 meta-analysis found that for medical professionals wearing N-95 masks could reduce the chances of getting sick up to 80% compared to no mask. A screening process was also put in place at airports to monitor air travel to and from affected countries.

SARS-CoV is most infectious in severely ill patients, which usually occurs during the second week of illness. This delayed infectious period meant that quarantine was highly effective; people who were isolated before day five of their illness rarely transmitted the disease to others.

As of 2017, the CDC was still working to make federal and local rapid-response guidelines and recommendations in the event of a reappearance of the virus.

== Treatment ==
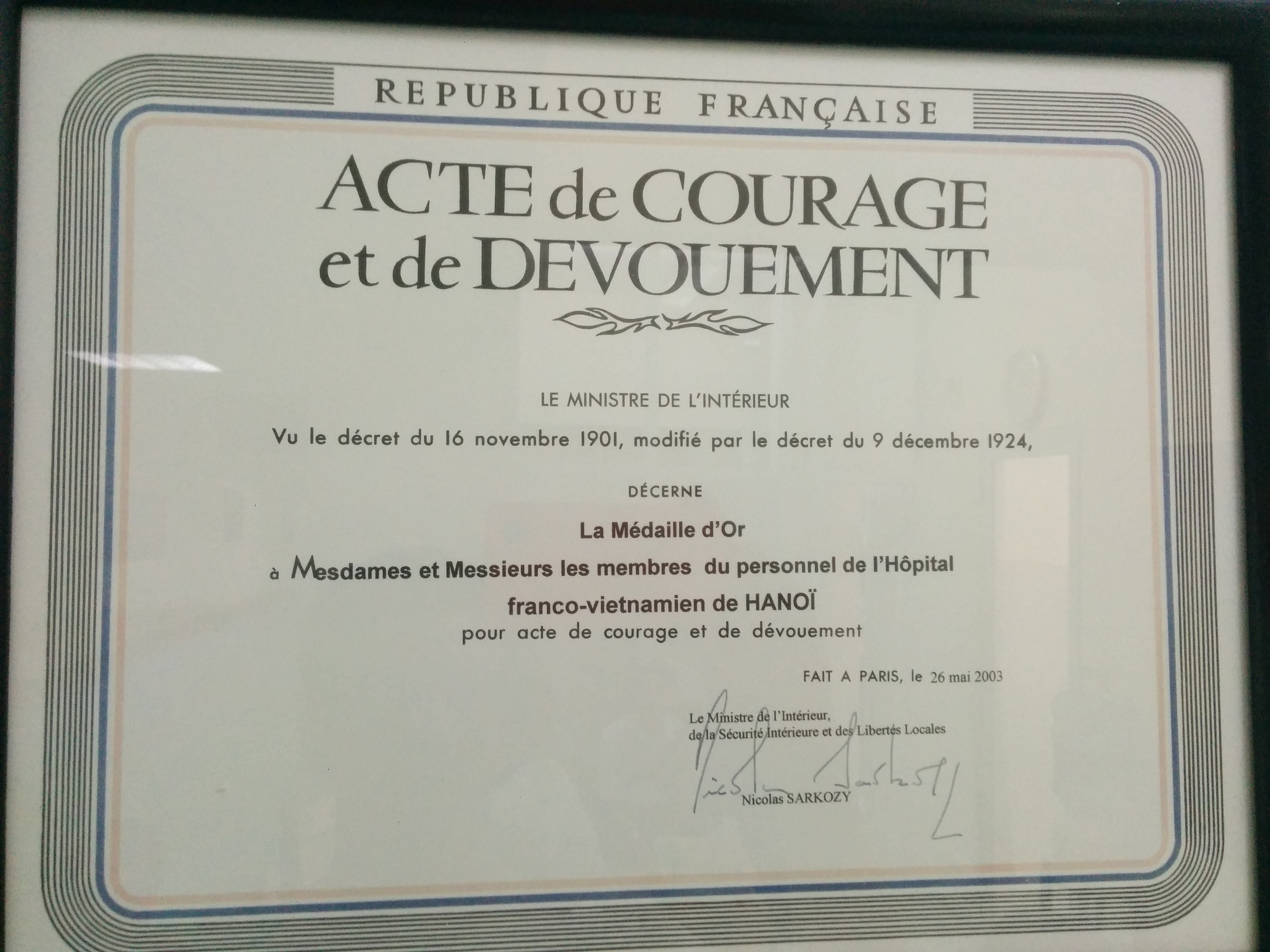
Award to the staff of the Hôpital Français de Hanoï for their dedication during the SARS crisis

There is no treatment shown to be effective against SARS; some attempted treatments may have been harmful. As SARS is a viral disease, antibiotics do not have direct effect but may be used against bacterial secondary infection. Treatment of SARS is mainly supportive with antipyretics, supplemental oxygen and mechanical ventilation as needed. While ribavirin is commonly used to treat SARS, there seems to have little to no effect on SARS-CoV, and no impact on patient's outcomes. There is currently no proven antiviral therapy. Tested substances include ribavirin, lopinavir, ritonavir, type I interferon, but have thus far shown no conclusive contribution to the disease's course. Administration of corticosteroids, is recommended by the British Thoracic Society/British Infection Society/Health Protection Agency in patients with severe disease and O2 saturation of <90%.

People with SARS-CoV must be isolated, preferably in negative-pressure rooms, with complete barrier nursing precautions taken for any necessary contact with these patients, to limit the chances of medical personnel becoming infected. In certain cases, natural ventilation by opening doors and windows is documented to help decreasing indoor concentration of virus particles.

Some of the more serious damage caused by SARS may be due to the body's own immune response. Understanding this effect maybe critical to developing effective treatments.

=== Vaccine ===
Vaccines can help the immune system to create enough antibodies and decrease a risk of side effects like arm pain, fever, and headache. According to research papers published in 2005 and 2006, the identification and development of novel vaccines and medicines to treat SARS was a priority for governments and public health agencies around the world. In early 2004, an early clinical trial on volunteers was planned. A major researcher's 2016 request, however, demonstrated that no field-ready SARS vaccine had been completed because likely market-driven priorities had ended funding.

== Prognosis ==
Several consequent reports from China on some recovered SARS patients showed severe long-time sequelae. The most typical diseases include, among other things, pulmonary fibrosis, osteoporosis, and femoral necrosis, which have led in some cases to the complete loss of working ability or even self-care ability of people who have recovered from SARS. As a result of quarantine procedures, some of the post-SARS patients have been diagnosed with post-traumatic stress disorder (PTSD) and major depressive disorder.

== Epidemiology ==
The epidemic origin of SARS was first reported in Foshan, China, on November 16, 2002. On February 28, 2003, Dr. Carlo Urbani, the WHO physician, formally identified SARS in patient zero in Vietnam French Hospital of Hanoi in Vietnam, died from the virus in Bangkok. His contributions on the epistemological traces of the virus have been highly regarded by the WHO.

No new cases of SARS have been reported since 2004. At the end of the epidemic in June 2003, the reported incidence was 8,422 cases with a case fatality rate (CFR) of 11%. The case fatality rate (CFR) ranges from 0% to 50% depending on the age group of the patient. Patients under 24 were least likely to die (less than 1%); those 65 and older were most likely to die (over 55%).

As with MERS and COVID-19, SARS resulted in significantly more deaths of males than females.

2003 Probable cases of SARS – worldwide

Probable cases of SARS by country or region, 1 November 2002 – 31 July 2003
Country or region	Cases	Deaths	Fatality (%)
China (Note: Figures for China exclude Hong Kong and Macau, which are reported separately by the WHO.)	5,327	349	6.6
Hong Kong	1,755	299	17.0
Taiwan (Note: After 11 July 2003, 325 Taiwanese cases were 'discarded'. Laboratory information was insufficient or incomplete for 135 of the discarded cases; 101 of these patients died.)	346	81	23.4
Canada	251	43	17.1
Singapore	238	33	13.9
Vietnam	63	5	7.9
United States	27	0	0
Philippines	14	2	14.3
Thailand	9	2	22.2
Germany	9	0	0
Mongolia	9	0	0
France	7	1	14.3
Australia	6	0	0
Malaysia	5	2	40.0
Sweden	5	0	0
United Kingdom	4	0	0
Italy	4	0	0
Brazil	3	0	0
India	3	0	0
South Korea	3	0	0
Indonesia	2	0	0
South Africa	1	1	100.0
Colombia	1	0	0
Kuwait	1	0	0
Ireland	1	0	0
Macao	1	0	0
New Zealand	1	0	0
Romania	1	0	0
Russia	1	0	0
Spain	1	0	0
Switzerland	1	0	0
Total excluding China	2,769	454	16.4
Total (29 territories)	8,096	782	9.6

=== Outbreak in South China ===
The SARS epidemic began in the Guangdong province of China in November 2002. The earliest case developed symptoms on 16 November 2002. Despite taking some action to control it, Chinese government officials did not inform the World Health Organization of the outbreak until February 2003. This lack of openness caused delays in efforts to control the epidemic, resulting in criticism of the People's Republic of China from the international community. China officially apologized for early slowness in dealing with the SARS epidemic. In 2003, when the virus broke out in China, a 72 year old with SARS infected multiple people on board an Air China Boeing 737, causing 5 deaths. The viral outbreak was subsequently genetically traced to a colony of cave-dwelling horseshoe bats in Xiyang Yi Ethnic Township, Yunnan.

The outbreak first came to the attention of the international medical community on 27 November 2002, when Canada's Global Public Health Intelligence Network (GPHIN), an electronic warning system that is part of the World Health Organization's Global Outbreak Alert and Response Network (GOARN), picked up reports of a "flu outbreak" in China through Internet media monitoring and analysis and sent them to the WHO. While GPHIN's capability had recently been upgraded to enable Arabic, Chinese, English, French, Russian, and Spanish translation, the system was limited to English or French in presenting this information. Thus, while the first reports of an unusual outbreak were in Chinese, an English report was not generated until 21 January 2003. The first super-spreader was admitted to the Sun Yat-sen Memorial Hospital in Guangzhou on 31 January, which soon spread the disease to nearby hospitals.

In early April 2003, after a prominent physician, Jiang Yanyong, pushed to report the danger to China, there appeared to be a change in official policy when SARS began to receive a much greater prominence in the official media. Some have directly attributed this to the death of an American teacher, James Earl Salisbury, in Hong Kong. It was around this same time that Jiang Yanyong made accusations regarding the undercounting of cases in Beijing military hospitals. After intense pressure, Chinese officials allowed international officials to investigate the situation there. This revealed problems plaguing the aging mainland Chinese healthcare system, including increasing decentralization, red tape, and inadequate communication.

Many healthcare workers in the affected nations risked their lives and died by treating patients, and trying to contain the infection before ways to prevent infection were known.

=== Spread to other regions ===
The epidemic reached the public spotlight in February 2003, when an American businessman traveling from China, Johnny Chen, became affected by pneumonia-like symptoms while on a flight to Singapore. The plane stopped in Hanoi, Vietnam, where the patient died in Hanoi French Hospital. Several of the medical staff who treated him soon developed the same disease despite basic hospital procedures. Italian doctor Carlo Urbani identified the threat and communicated it to WHO and the Vietnamese government; he later died from the disease.

The severity of the symptoms and the infection among hospital staff alarmed global health authorities, who were fearful of another emergent pneumonia epidemic. On 12 March 2003, the WHO issued a global alert, followed by a health alert by the United States Centers for Disease Control and Prevention (CDC). Local transmission of SARS took place in Toronto, Ottawa, San Francisco, Ulaanbaatar, Manila, Singapore, Taiwan, Hanoi and Hong Kong whereas within China it spread to Guangdong, Jilin, Hebei, Hubei, Shaanxi, Jiangsu, Shanxi, Tianjin, and Inner Mongolia.

==== Hong Kong ====
9th-floor layout of the Hotel Metropole in Hong Kong, showing where a super-spreading event of severe acute respiratory syndrome (SARS) occurred

The disease spread in Hong Kong from Liu Jianlun, a Guangdong doctor who was treating patients at Sun Yat-Sen Memorial Hospital. He arrived in February and stayed on the ninth floor of the Metropole Hotel in Kowloon, infecting 16 of the hotel visitors. Those visitors traveled to Canada, Singapore, Taiwan, and Vietnam, spreading SARS to those locations.

Another larger cluster of cases in Hong Kong centred on the Amoy Gardens housing estate. Its spread is suspected to have been facilitated by defects in its bathroom drainage system that allowed sewer gases including virus particles to vent into the room. Bathroom fans exhausted the gases and wind carried the contagion to adjacent downwind complexes. Concerned citizens in Hong Kong worried that information was not reaching people quickly enough and created a website called sosick.org, which eventually forced the Hong Kong government to provide information related to SARS in a timely manner. The first cohort of affected people were discharged from hospital on 29 March 2003.

==== Canada ====
The first case of SARS in Toronto was identified on 23 February 2003. Beginning with an elderly woman, Kwan Sui-Chu, who had returned from a trip to Hong Kong and died on 5 March, the virus eventually infected 257 individuals in the province of Ontario. The trajectory of this outbreak is typically divided into two phases, the first centring around her son Tse Chi Kwai, who infected other patients at the Scarborough Grace Hospital and died on 13 March. The second major wave of cases was clustered around accidental exposure among patients, visitors, and staff within the North York General Hospital. The WHO officially removed Toronto from its list of infected areas by the end of June 2003.

The official response by the Ontario provincial government and Canadian federal government has been widely criticized in the years following the outbreak. Brian Schwartz, vice-chair of Ontario's SARS Scientific Advisory Committee, described public health officials' preparedness and emergency response at the time of the outbreak as "very, very basic and minimal at best". Critics of the response often cite poorly outlined and enforced protocol for protecting healthcare workers and identifying infected patients as a major contributing factor to the continued spread of the virus. The atmosphere of fear and uncertainty surrounding the outbreak resulted in staffing issues in area hospitals when healthcare workers elected to resign rather than risk exposure to SARS.

=== Identification of virus ===
In late February 2003, Italian doctor Carlo Urbani was called into The French Hospital of Hanoi to look at Johnny Chen, an American businessman who had fallen ill with what doctors thought was a bad case of influenza. Urbani realized that Chen's ailment was probably a new and highly contagious disease. He immediately notified the WHO. He also persuaded the Vietnamese Health Ministry to begin isolating patients and screening travelers, thus slowing the early pace of the epidemic. He subsequently contracted the disease himself, and died in March 2003.

Malik Peiris and his colleagues became the first to isolate the virus that causes SARS, a novel coronavirus now known as SARS-CoV-1. By June 2003, Peiris, together with his long-time collaborators Leo Poon and Guan Yi, has developed a rapid diagnostic test for SARS-CoV-1 using real-time polymerase chain reaction. The CDC and Canada's National Microbiology Laboratory identified the SARS genome in April 2003. Scientists at Erasmus University in Rotterdam, the Netherlands demonstrated that the SARS coronavirus fulfilled Koch's postulates thereby suggesting it as the causative agent. In the experiments, macaques infected with the virus developed the same symptoms as human SARS patients.

==== Origin and animal vectors ====
In late May 2003, a study was conducted using samples of wild animals sold as food in the local market in Guangdong, China. The study found that "SARS-like" coronaviruses could be isolated from masked palm civets (Paguma sp.). Genomic sequencing determined that these animal viruses were very similar to human SARS viruses, however they were phylogenetically distinct, and so the study concluded that it was unclear whether they were the natural reservoir in the wild. Still, more than 10,000 masked palm civets were killed in Guangdong Province since they were a "potential infectious source." The virus was also later found in raccoon dogs (Nyctereuteus sp.), ferret badgers (Melogale spp.), and domestic cats.

In 2005, two studies identified a number of SARS-like coronaviruses in Chinese bats. Phylogenetic analysis of these viruses indicated a high probability that SARS coronavirus originated in bats and spread to humans either directly or through animals held in Chinese markets. The bats did not show any visible signs of disease, but are the likely natural reservoirs of SARS-like coronaviruses. In late 2006, scientists from the Chinese Centre for Disease Control and Prevention of Hong Kong University and the Guangzhou Centre for Disease Control and Prevention established a genetic link between the SARS coronavirus appearing in civets and in the second, 2004 human outbreak, bearing out claims that the disease had jumped across species.

It took 14 years to find the original bat population likely responsible for the SARS pandemic. In December 2017, "after years of searching across China, where the disease first emerged, researchers reported ... that they had found a remote cave in Xiyang Yi Ethnic Township, Yunnan province, which is home to horseshoe bats that carry a strain of a particular virus known as a coronavirus. This strain has all the genetic building blocks of the type that triggered the global outbreak of SARS in 2002." The research was performed by Shi Zhengli, Cui Jie, and co-workers at the Wuhan Institute of Virology, China, and published in PLOS Pathogens. The authors are quoted as stating that "another deadly outbreak of SARS could emerge at any time. The cave where they discovered their strain is only a kilometre from the nearest village." The virus was ephemeral and seasonal in bats. In 2019, a similar virus to SARS caused a cluster of infections in Wuhan, eventually leading to the COVID-19 pandemic.

A small number of cats and dogs tested positive for the virus during the outbreak. However, these animals did not transmit the virus to other animals of the same species or to humans.

=== Containment ===
The World Health Organization declared severe acute respiratory syndrome contained on 5 July 2003. The containment was achieved through successful public health measures. In the following months, four SARS cases were reported in China between December 2003 and January 2004.

While SARS-CoV-1 probably persists as a potential zoonotic threat in its original animal reservoir, human-to-human transmission of this virus may be considered eradicated because no human case has been documented since four minor, brief, subsequent outbreaks in 2004.

=== Laboratory accidents ===
After containment, there were four laboratory accidents that resulted in infections.

- One postdoctoral student at the National University of Singapore in Singapore in August 2003
- A 44-year-old senior scientist at the National Defense University in Taipei in December 2003. He was confirmed to have the SARS virus after working on a SARS study in Taiwan's only BSL-4 lab. The Taiwan CDC later stated the infection occurred due to laboratory misconduct.
- Two researchers at the Chinese Institute of Virology in Beijing, China around April 2004, who spread it to around six other people. The two researchers contracted it 2 weeks apart.

Study of live SARS specimens requires a biosafety level 3 (BSL-3) facility; some studies of inactivated SARS specimens can be done at biosafety level 2 facilities.

== Society and culture ==
Fear of contracting the virus from consuming infected wild animals resulted in public bans and reduced business for meat markets in southern China and Hong Kong. The WHO declared the end of the pandemic on 24 March 2004.

== See also ==
- 2009 swine flu pandemic
- Aerosol
- Avian influenza
- Bat-borne virus
- Coronavirus disease 2019 – a disease caused by Severe acute respiratory syndrome coronavirus 2
- Health crisis
- Health in China
- Healthy building
- Indoor air quality
- List of medical professionals who died during the SARS outbreak
- Middle East respiratory syndrome – a coronavirus discovered in June 2012 in Saudi Arabia
- SARS conspiracy theory
- Sick building syndrome
- Zhong Nanshan
