= Kunyang (disambiguation) =

Kunyang is a town in Ye County, Pingdingshan, Henan province, China.

Kunyang may also refer to:

- Kunyang Chhish, a subrange in the Karakoram mountains in Pakistan
- Kunyang metro station, a station on the Bannan line located in Nangang District, Taipei, Taiwan
- Kunyang Subdistrict, a subdistrict and the administrative center of Jinning District, Yunnan, China
- Sunny Cheung (張崑陽; Zhang Kunyang), Hong Kong activist and politician

== See also ==
- 昆陽 (disambiguation)
