= Malik Peiris =

Sri Lankan virologist

Professor Malik Peiris SBS FRS FRCP FRCPath FFPH FAAM
- මලික් පීරිස්
- Born: Joseph Sriyal Malik Peiris; 10 November 1949 (age 76); Kandy, Ceylon
- Other names: Joseph Sriyal Malik Peiris; Joseph Peiris; JSM Peiris
- Education: University of Ceylon (MBBS); University of Oxford (DPhil)
- Spouse: Sharmini Arseculeratne
- Children: Shalini (d); Shehan (s)
- Relatives: Sarathnanda "Chubby" Arsecularatne (father-in-law)
- Awards: John Dirks Canada Gairdner Global Health Award; Silver Bauhinia Star; Chevalier de la Legion d’Honneur
- Scientific career
- Fields: Virology
- Workplaces: University of Hong Kong; Royal Victoria Infirmary; University of Peradeniya
- Thesis: Enhancement by antiviral antibody of the replication of togaviridae in mononuclear phagocytes (1980)
- Doctoral advisor: James S. Porterfield

Joseph Sriyal Malik Peiris (Sinhala: ජෝසප් ශ්‍රියාල් මලික් පීරිස්, born 10 November 1949) is a Hong Kong-based Sri Lankan virologist, most notable for being the first person to isolate the SARS virus. He is the current Tam Wah-Ching Professor in Medical Science, and Chair Professor of Virology at the Division of Public Health Laboratory Sciences, School of Public Health, University of Hong Kong. He was a member of the Strategic Advisory Group of Experts on Immunization of the World Health Organization from 2009 to 2010.

== Early life and education ==
Peiris was born on 10 November 1949 in Kandy, Sri Lanka. He attended school at St. Anthony's College, Kandy, and entered the University of Ceylon, Peradeniya in 1967, obtaining his MBBS in 1972.

After a year with the National Health Department at the General Hospital in Matale, Peiris joined the Department of Microbiology at his alma mater, where Sarathnanda "Chubby" Arseculeratne, Peiris's future father-in-law, worked at the time. Despite his interest in immunology, Peiris started working on virology at the urge of Arseculeratne. He was awarded a Commonwealth Scholarship in 1977 and went to the University of Oxford for a DPhil at the Sir William Dunn School of Pathology, graduating in 1981. A major aspect of his DPhil study was the paradoxical role that antibodies may play in facilitating rather than blocking the entry of viruses, such as the West Nile virus and the dengue virus, into macrophages, a type of white blood cell. He underwent his training in clinical pathology at the Public Health Laboratory at Birmingham and Newcastle University, and completed his pathologist examination in 1982.

== Career and research ==
After his DPhil, Peiris returned to Sri Lanka as a senior lecturer and set up a virology department at the University of Peradeniya, which was created after the split-up of the University of Sri Lanka (formerly the University of Ceylon).

In 1988, because of the Sri Lankan Civil War, Peiris went back to Newcastle upon Tyne to become a consultant virologist at the Royal Victoria Infirmary. He moved to Hong Kong in 1995, tasked with setting up a clinical virology unit at Queen Mary Hospital and the University of Hong Kong.

Peiris's research interest is in emerging viral diseases, especially those passed from animals to humans, using a multidisciplinary approach termed "One-Health", which Peiris has defined as a "collaboration between the animal health, environmental health, human health, and laboratory sectors."

Currently at HKU, Malik is the Tam Wah-Ching Professor in Medical Science and Chair Professor of Virology at the Division of Public health Laboratory Sciences, School of Public Health. Since 2021, he has been working part time. He is also a co-director of the WHO H5 Reference Laboratory and the WHO SARS-CoV-2 reference laboratory, the Director of Centre of Influenza Research and the managing director of the centre for Immunology and Infection. He retired from the position of co-director of the HKU-Pasteur Research Pole, jointly created in 2000 by HKU and the Pasteur Institute in France, and became an Honorary Director.

Peiris has been an editor of Current Opinion in Virology since 2011 and of mBio since 2016.

Peiris has held a number of roles at the Hong Kong government, including a member of the Advisory panel on Emerging Infectious Diseases of the Hong Kong Centre for Health Protection (CHP) and the Hong Kong Research Grants Council between 2007 and 2009. He currently sits on the CHP Scientific Committee on Emerging and Zoonotic Diseases and Scientific Committee on Vector-borne Diseases.

== Notable findings ==
=== Avian influenza ===
In 1997, after the first human outbreak of the avian influenza H5N1 virus in Hong Kong, Peiris turned his attention to the virus, which claimed the lives of a third of its victims. Research in his group showed that the virus induces a high level of cytokines when a type of white blood cell called macrophage is infected. This so-called "cytokine storm" is now recognized as a major mechanism of avian influenza virus pathogenesis.

=== Severe Acute Respiratory Syndrome (SARS) ===
In 2003, Hong Kong suffered another viral disease outbreak, this time an unknown respiratory disease, termed severe acute respiratory syndrome, or SARS. Peiris became known worldwide when his group became the first to isolate the virus that causes this disease, a novel coronavirus now known as SARS-CoV-1. By June 2003, Peiris, together with his long-time collaborators Leo Poon and Guan Yi, has developed a rapid diagnostic test for SARS-CoV-1 using real-time polymerase chain reaction.

=== COVID-19 ===
In February 2020, Peiris published an article in Nature Medicine, presaging the COVID-19 pandemic. Peiris reported the next month that a Pomeranian dog was infected with COVID-19. This was later substantiated by other COVID-19 animal infection cases across the world, including a tiger at the Bronx Zoo and a pug dog in North Carolina.

He and collaborators also developed a diagnostic test for 2019-nCoV (later renamed to SARS-CoV-2), again using real-time polymerase chain reaction, and found that SARS-CoV-2 survives well on smooth surfaces and is susceptible to disinfectants such as household bleach, ethanol and benzalkonium chloride.

== Honours and awards ==
- Fellow of the Royal College of Physicians
- Fellow of the Royal College of Pathologists
- Fellow of the Faculty of Public Health
- Fellow of the Royal Society (2006) (First Sri Lankan elected)
- Asian Hero of the past 60 years, Time (2006)
- Chevalier de la Légion d'honneur, France (2007)
- Mahathir Science Award, Academy of Sciences Malaysia (2007)
- Silver Bauhinia Star, Hong Kong (2008)
- International member of the National Academy of Sciences (2017)
- Future Science Prize Life Science Prize, China (2021)
- John Dirks Canada Gairdner Global Health Award (2021)

== Personal life ==
Peiris is married to Sharmini Arseculeratne and they have a daughter, Shalini and a son, Shehan.

Sarathnanda "Chubby" Arseculeratne, an Emeritus Professor at the Faculty of Medicine, University of Peradeniya, is Peiris's father-in-law and his early mentor.
