= List of medical professionals who died during the SARS outbreak =

This is a list of medical professionals who died during the SARS outbreak in 2003.

== List ==
Name	Position	Affiliation	Place of death	Date of death
Carlo Urbani	Doctor	World Health Organization	(Thailand) Bangkok	29 March 2003
Lin Yung-hsiang (林永祥)	Doctor	Department of Internal Medicine, Kaoshiung Chang Gung Memorial Hospital	(Taiwan) Kaohsiung	16 May 2003
Chen Ching-chiu (陳靜秋)	Head nurse	Taipei Municipal Hoping Hospital	(Taiwan) Taipei	1 May 2003
Chen-lü Li-yü (陳呂麗玉)	Cleaner	Taipei Municipal Hoping Hospital	(Taiwan) Taipei	3 May 2003
Hu Kwei-fang (胡貴芳)	Nurse	Jen Chi Hospital	(Taiwan) Taipei	7 May 2003
Lin Chia-ling (林佳鈴)	Nurse	Taipei Municipal Hoping Hospital	(Taiwan) Taipei	11 May 2003
Kuo kuo-chan (郭國展)	Ambulanceman	Yanping Branch, Taipei Municipal Fire Station	(Taiwan) Taipei	15 May 2003
Lin Chung-wei (林重威)	Doctor	Taipei Municipal Hoping Hospital	(Taiwan) Taipei	15 May 2003
Cheng Hsueh-huei (鄭雪慧)	Vice Director	Nursing Department, Taipei Municipal Hoping Hospital	(Taiwan) Taipei	18 May 2003
Yang Shu-chen (楊淑媜)	Nursing Secretary	Taipei Municipal Hoping Hospital	(Taiwan) Taipei	28 May 2003
Tsai Tsiao-miao (蔡巧妙)	Medical technologist	Taipei Municipal Hoping Hospital	(Taiwan) Taipei	13 June 2003
Lau Tai Kwan (劉大鈞)	Paediatrics Doctor	Private Clinic	Hong Kong	3 April 2003
Lau Wing-kai (劉永佳)	Nurse	Thoracic Medical Department, Tuen Mun Hospital	Hong Kong	26 April 2003
Tse Yuen-man (謝婉雯)	Doctor	Thoracic Medical Department, Tuen Mun Hospital	Hong Kong	13 May 2003
Tang Heung-mei (鄧香美)	Health Assistant	United Christian Hospital	Hong Kong	16 May 2003
Lau Kam-yung (劉錦蓉)	Health Assistant	United Christian Hospital	Hong Kong	27 May 2003
Wong Kang-tai (王庚娣)	Health Assistant	The Prince of Wales Hospital	Hong Kong	31 May 2003
Cheung Sik-hin (張錫憲)	Otolaryngology Doctor	Private Clinic	Hong Kong	31 May 2003
Cheng Ha-yan (鄭夏恩)	Doctor	Tai Po Hospital	Hong Kong	1 June 2003
Ye Xin (葉欣)	Head nurse	Ersha Island Branch, Guanggong Provincial Hospital of Traditional Chinese Medicine	(China) Guangzhou	23 March 2003
Li Xiaohong (李曉紅)	Doctor	Beijing Armed Police General Hospital	(China) Beijing	16 April 2003
Deng Lianxian (鄧練賢)	Doctor	Third Affiliated Hospital of Sun Yat-sen University	(China) Guangzhou	21 April 2003
Liang Shikui (梁世奎)	Deputy Director	Emergency Unit, Shanxi Provincial People's Hospital	(China) Taiyuan	24 April 2003
Wang Jing (王晶)	Nurse	Emergency Unit, Peking University People's Hospital	(China) Beijing	27 April 2003
Yang Tao (楊濤)	Doctor	Radiology Department, Luhe Hospital	(China) Beijing	6 May 2003
Ding Xiulan (丁秀蘭)	Medical Director	Peking University People's Hospital	(China) Beijing	13 May 2003
Wang Jianhua (王建華)	Nurse	Luhe Hospital	(China) Beijing	2003
Chao/Zhao Guanghao, Alexandre (趙光灝)	Vascular Surgeon	Vascular Department, Singapore General Hospital	Singapore	22 April 2003
Ong Hok Su	Doctor	Tan Tock Seng Hospital	Singapore	7 April 2003
Hamidah Ismail	Nurse	Tan Tock Seng Hospital	Singapore	11 May 2003
Jonnel Pabuyon Pinera	Nurse	Orange Valley Nursing Home	Singapore	2003
Kiew Miyaw Tan	Hospital Attendant	Singapore General Hospital	Singapore	2003
Nguyễn Thị Lượng	Nurse	Hanoi French Hospital	(Vietnam) Hanoi	15 March 2003
Phạm Thị Uyên	Nurse	Hanoi French Hospital	(Vietnam) Hanoi	24 March 2003
Nguyễn Thế Phưong	Doctor	Hanoi French Hospital	(Vietnam) Hanoi	24 March 2003
Nguyễn Hữu Bội	Doctor	Hanoi French Hospital	(Vietnam) Hanoi	12 April 2003
Jean Paul Dirosier	Doctor	Hanoi French Hospital	(Vietnam) Hanoi	19 March 2003
Nestor Yanga	Doctor	Lapsley Family Doctors	(Canada) Toronto	13 August 2003
Nelia Laroza	Nurse	North York General Hospital	(Canada) Toronto	29 June 2003
Tecla Lin	Nurse	West Park HealthcareCentre	(Canada) Toronto	19 July 2003
