= 2002–2004 SARS outbreak =

Epidemic of severe acute respiratory syndrome originating in China

- Map of the infected countries of the epidemic of SARS between 1 Nov 2002 and 7 Aug 2003 Countries with confirmed deaths Countries with confirmed infections Countries without confirmed cases
- Map of SARS cases and deaths around the world regarding the global population
- Disease: SARS
- Pathogen: SARS-CoV-1
- Location: Worldwide mostly in East Asia
- First outbreak: Shunde, Guangdong, China
- Index case: 16 Nov 2002
- Arrival date: Early 2003
- Date: 16 Nov 2002 – 19 May 2004 (1 year, 6 months and 3 days)
- Confirmed cases: 8,096
- Deaths: 774
- Territories: Around 30 countries

The 2002–2004 outbreak of SARS, caused by severe acute respiratory syndrome coronavirus (SARS-CoV or SARS-CoV-1), infected over 8,000 people from 30 countries and territories, and resulted in at least 774 deaths worldwide.

The outbreak was first identified in Foshan, Guangdong, China, in November 2002. The World Health Organization (WHO) was notified of the outbreak in February 2003, and issued a global alert in March 2003. Initially, the cause of the outbreak was unknown, and some media outlets reported that an influenza virus was a potential culprit. The major part of the outbreak lasted about 8 months, and the World Health Organization declared SARS contained on 5 July 2003. However, several SARS cases were reported until May 2004.

In late December 2019, SARS-CoV-2, a coronavirus in the same genus as the one that caused SARS, was discovered in Wuhan, Hubei, China. This strain causes COVID-19, which spread to other areas of Asia, and then worldwide in early 2020, marking the start of the COVID-19 pandemic.

== Outbreak by country and territory ==
2003 probable cases of SARS worldwide

Probable cases of SARS by country and territory, 1 November 2002 – 31 July 2003
Country or region	Cases	Deaths	Fatality (%)
Mainland China (Note: Figures for China exclude Hong Kong, Macau and Taiwan, which are reported separately by the WHO.)	5,327	349	6.6
Hong Kong	1,755	299	17.0
Taiwan (Note: After 11 July 2003, 325 Taiwanese cases were 'discarded'. Laboratory information was insufficient or incomplete for 135 of the discarded cases; 101 of these patients died.)	346	73	21.1
Canada	251	43	17.1
Singapore	238	33	13.9
Vietnam	63	5	7.9
United States	27	0	0
Philippines	14	2	14.3
Thailand	9	2	22.2
Germany	9	0	0
Mongolia	9	0	0
France	7	1	14.3
Australia	6	0	0
Malaysia	5	2	40.0
Sweden	5	0	0
United Kingdom	4	0	0
Italy	4	0	0
India	3	0	0
South Korea	3	0	0
Indonesia	2	0	0
South Africa	1	1	100.0
Kuwait	1	0	0
Ireland	1	0	0
Macau	1	0	0
New Zealand	1	0	0
Romania	1	0	0
Russia	1	0	0
Spain	1	0	0
Switzerland	1	0	0
Total excluding China	2,769	425	15.4
Total (30 territories)	8,096	774	9.6

== Timeline ==
=== November 2002 ===
On 16 November 2002, an outbreak of severe acute respiratory syndrome (SARS) began in China's Guangdong province, bordering Hong Kong. The first case of infection was traced to Foshan. This first outbreak affected people in the food industry, such as farmers, market vendors, and chefs. The outbreak spread to healthcare workers after people sought medical treatment for the disease. The People's Republic of China notified the World Health Organization (WHO) about this outbreak on 11 February 2003, reporting 305 cases including 105 health-care workers and five deaths. Later, it reported that the outbreak in Guangdong had peaked in mid-February 2003. However, this appears to have been false because subsequently 806 cases of infection and 34 deaths were reported. Italian physician Carlo Urbani was the first to identify SARS as probably a new and dangerously contagious viral disease.

Early in the epidemic, the Chinese government discouraged its press from reporting on SARS, delayed reporting to WHO, and initially did not provide information to Chinese outside Guangdong province, where the disease is believed to have originated. Also, a WHO team that travelled to Beijing was not allowed to visit Guangdong province for several weeks. This resulted in international criticism, which seems to have led to a change in government policy in early April.

=== January 2003 ===
A fishmonger, named Zhou Zuofen, checked in to the Sun Yat-sen Memorial Hospital in Guangzhou on 31 January, where he infected 30 nurses and doctors. The virus soon spread to nearby hospitals.

=== February 2003 ===
==== Hong Kong ====
Ninth floor layout of the Hotel Metropole in Hong Kong, showing where an outbreak of the severe acute respiratory syndrome (SARS) occurred

In February 2003, Liu Jianlun became Hong Kong's SARS index patient. He and his wife had come to attend a wedding; Liu was on the staff at Sun Yat-Sen Memorial Hospital in Guangzhou and had treated SARS patients.

On 21 February, Liu and his wife checked into room 911 on the ninth floor of the Metropole Hotel. Despite feeling ill he and his family traveled around Hong Kong. By the morning of 22 February, he knew he was very ill and walked to the Accident and Emergency Department of Kwong Wah Hospital to seek treatment. He was treated by the triage nurse and doctor without protective measures even though a memorandum on surveillance of severe community-acquired pneumonia had been issued by the Hospital Authority of Hong Kong. After Liu's chest X-ray taken in Kwong Wah Hospital became available, staff became aware of the situation, wearing personal protective equipment and full isolation inside the ICU. He did not recover and died on 4 March.

Liu is believed to have been a SARS super-spreader: 23 other Metropole guests developed SARS, including seven from the ninth floor. Liu's brother-in-law, who sought treatment in late February, was hospitalized in Kwong Wah Hospital on 1 March and died on 19 March. It is estimated that around 80% of the Hong Kong cases were due to Liu.

==== Vietnam ====
The virus was carried to Hanoi, Vietnam, by Chinese-American Johnny Chen, a resident of Shanghai who had roomed across the hall from Liu at the Metropole. He was admitted to the French Hospital of Hanoi on 26 February, where he infected at least 38 members of the staff. Even though he was evacuated, he died on 13 March. Carlo Urbani, a World Health Organization (WHO) infectious disease specialist, was among the staff who examined Chen. Urbani observed that other hospital staff were already falling ill and realized that he was dealing with a new and dangerous disease. He himself became infected and died on 29 March.

==== Canada ====
On 23 February, an elderly woman named Kwan Sui-Chu who had also been a Metropole Hotel guest, returned to Toronto, Canada, from Hong Kong. She died at home on 5 March, after infecting her son Tse Chi Kwai, who subsequently spread the disease to Scarborough Grace Hospital and died on 13 March.

=== March 2003 ===
==== Singapore ====
On 1 March, 26-year-old Esther Mok, another Metropole guest, was admitted to Tan Tock Seng Hospital after visiting Hong Kong, starting the outbreak in Singapore. Although she recovered, various family members did not.

==== Taiwan ====
The first cases of atypical pneumonia in Taiwan were identified in a Guangdong-based businessman and his wife on 14 March and confirmed on 17 March. He had returned to Taiwan via Hong Kong on 23 February and reported a fever two days later. His wife became ill after caring for him, and both were admitted to National Taiwan University Hospital. Taiwan's third case of the disease was identified in a Yilan hospital on 15 March. Like the first case, the third case appeared in someone who had traveled to Guangdong and transited through Hong Kong before arriving in Taiwan. Shortly after the third case was diagnosed, officials from the Centers for Disease Control and Prevention in the United States traveled to Taiwan to study the disease. The fourth case, in another traveler to Guangdong, was identified in Chiayi on 18 March, after he sought treatment at a hospital the previous day. By 22 March, six cases in Taiwan had matched the World Health Organization definition of probable.

==== Hong Kong ====
On 4 March, a 27-year-old man, who had visited a guest on the Metropole's 9th floor 11 days earlier, was admitted to Hong Kong's Prince of Wales Hospital. At least 99 hospital workers (including 17 medical students) were infected while treating him.

On 11 March, Carlo Urbani travelled to Bangkok, Thailand, to attend a medical conference. He fell ill during the flight and told a friend waiting in Bangkok not to touch him, to call an ambulance and take him to a hospital. He was isolated in an intensive care unit. A similar outbreak of a mysterious respiratory infection was reported among Hong Kong healthcare workers.

On 12 March, WHO issued a global alert about a new infectious disease of unknown origin in both Vietnam and Hong Kong. On 15 March, WHO issued a heightened global health alert about a mysterious pneumonia with a case definition of SARS after cases in Singapore and Canada were also identified. The alert included a rare emergency travel advisory to international travelers, healthcare professionals, and health authorities. The Centers for Disease Control (CDC) issued a travel advisory stating that persons considering travel to the affected areas in Asia (Hong Kong, Singapore, Vietnam, and China) should not go.

On 17 March, an international network of 11 laboratories was established to determine the cause of SARS and develop potential treatments.

On 25 March, Hong Kong authorities stated that nine tourists had contracted the disease from a mainland Chinese man who had boarded the same plane on 15 March, Air China Flight 112 to Beijing.

On 27 March, Arthur K. C. Li, head of the Hong Kong Education and Manpower Bureau, announced cancellation of all classes in educational institutions. The Ministry of Education in Singapore announced that all primary schools, secondary schools, and junior colleges were to be shut until 6 April 2003. Polytechnics and universities were not affected. On 29 March, Urbani died in Bangkok.

On 30 March, Hong Kong authorities quarantined estate E of the Amoy Gardens housing estate due to a massive (200+ cases) outbreak in the building. The balcony was completely closed and guarded by the police. The residents of the building were later transferred to the quarantined Lei Yue Mun Holiday Camp and Lady MacLehose Holiday Village on 1 April because the building was deemed a health hazard.

Most of the cases were linked to apartments with a north-western orientation which shared the same sewage pipe. According to government officials, the virus was brought into the estate by an infected kidney patient (the type of kidney illness was not specified) after discharge from Prince of Wales Hospital, who visited his elder brother living on the seventh floor. Through excretion, the virus spread through drainage. One theory speculated that the virus was spread by airborne transmission, through dried up U-shaped P-traps in the drainage system which a maritime breeze blew into the estate's balconies and stairwell ventilation. It was confirmed that the virus spread via droplets, but this later outbreak made officials question the possibility that the virus could be spread through the air.

=== April 2003 ===
On 1 April, the U.S. government called back non-essential personnel in their consulate office in Hong Kong and Guangzhou. The US government also advised US citizens not to travel to the region.

On 2 April, Chinese medical officials began reporting the status of the SARS outbreak. China's southern Guangdong province reported 361 new infections and 9 new deaths, increasing the total Mainland China figures previously reported at end-February. The virus was also detected in Beijing and Shanghai. The WHO also advised travellers to avoid Hong Kong and Guangdong during a press briefing.

On 3 April, a WHO team of international scientists landed in Guangzhou from Beijing to discuss with officials, but the team was yet to inspect any suspected origin or any medical facilities on the progress of infection control. Fifteen of the quarantined Amoy Gardens residents at Lei Yue Mun Holiday Camp were relocated to the Sai Kung Outdoor Recreation Centre after an overnight protest on washroom sharing. The first medical worker infected with SARS died in Hong Kong. The doctor's daughter and infected wife survived his illness, although the wife was also among the quarantined medical workers under intensive care. Hong Kong school closures were extended by two weeks to 21 April.

On 4 April, the WHO team inspected the first infection case in Foshan County. The person infected four people but did not infect his family. A 40-year-old woman became the first local case in Shanghai. A Chinese health specialist admitted at a press conference to not informing the public early enough about the outbreak. The PRC Health Minister also claimed that the disease has been under control in most parts of mainland China. He also released the names of seven drugs which he claimed to be effective in curing SARS. WHO officials said that the information provided by the PRC about the disease has been "very detailed". US government enforced compulsory quarantine of an infected person.

On 5 April, the Singapore government announced that school closures would be extended. Junior colleges were to reopen on 9 April, secondary schools would reopen on 14 April and primary schools and pre-schools would reopen on 16 April. On 6 April, a SARS case was found in Manila, a person who had returned from Hong Kong.

On 8 April, SARS was discovered in the Lower Ngau Tau Kok Estate near Amoy Gardens in Kowloon. Hong Kong health officials warned that SARS had spread so far domestically and abroad that it was here to stay. Nevertheless, WHO officials remained cautiously optimistic that the disease could still be contained.

On 9 April, James Earl Salisbury died of SARS at a hospital in Hong Kong. An American Mormon and a teacher at Shenzhen Polytechnic, he had been sick for approximately one month before his death, but he was originally diagnosed with pneumonia. His son Michael "Mickey" Salisbury was with him in China and also contracted the disease, but he survived it. Salisbury's death led to more open admissions by the Chinese government about the spread of SARS.

On 10 April, Jim Hughes, the head of infectious disease at the CDC, confirming the warnings of Hong Kong health officials, claimed that he believed that SARS could no longer be eradicated in the Far East. However, he remained hopeful that it could be prevented from spreading widely in North America. On 11 April, the World Health Organization issued a global health alert for SARS as it became clear the disease was being spread by global air travel.

On 12 April, Marco Marra, director of the Michael Smith Genome Sciences Centre, which is part of the British Columbia Cancer Agency, announced that scientists at his centre had broken the genetic code of the virus suspected of causing the disease. In Toronto, three more people died of SARS, bringing the Canadian death toll to 13. On 16 April, the WHO issued a press release stating that the coronavirus identified by a number of laboratories was the official cause of SARS. The virus was officially named the SARS virus.

On 17 April, the first confirmed case of SARS from India was reported. On 19 April, Premier of the People's Republic of China Wen Jiabao announced that there would be severe consequences for local officials who did not report SARS cases in a timely and accurate manner, signaling a major change in policy. SARS had also been gaining prominence in the mainland Chinese media; by late April, it had jumped from virtual invisibility onto the front page, with daily reports from all provinces on new cases and measures.

On 20 April, Beijing's mayor Meng Xuenong and the health minister of the PRC Zhang Wenkang were replaced respectively by Wang Qishan from Hainan and the former deputy health minister Gao Qiang. They were the first two high-rank officials in the PRC to be dismissed because of the fallout of the epidemic. In the news conference chaired by Gao Qiang several hours earlier, the PRC admitted that in Beijing there were more than 300 cases, as opposed to the previous figure of only 37. The figure had increased to 407 the following day. Chinese officials also admitted to major underreporting of cases, which were attributed to bureaucratic ineptitude.

On 22 April, schools in Hong Kong started to reopen in stages. On 23 April, Beijing announced that all primary and secondary schools would be closed for two weeks. A few days before, some colleges in Peking University had been closed because some students had been infected. The WHO issued travel advisories against Beijing, Toronto, and Shanxi.

After several cases of SARS were diagnosed in Taiwan throughout the month of April, including a cluster at Taipei Municipal Hospital's Hoping branch, the Taipei City Government closed that hospital and quarantined its 930 staff and 240 patients for two weeks. The decision to lock down the medical facility was protested by hospital staff.

On 24 April, the Hong Kong Government announced an HK$11.8 billion relief package designed to assist Hong Kong's battered tourism, entertainment, retail, and catering sectors, consisting of a waiver of tourism- and transport-related license fees, and HK$1 billion allocated for tourism promotion overseas. The package also includes a salaries tax rebate and reduced rates.

On 26 April, Wu Yi was named Zhang Wenkang's replacement as PRC health minister. On 26–27 April, Chinese authorities locked down Beijing, closing down theatres, discos, and other entertainment venues in Beijing as the death toll in Beijing continued to rise, threatening to become the worst-hit area of the country, eclipsing the province of Guangdong. People who may have been exposed were ordered to stay home. Authorities were bolstered by the fact that the infection rate seemed to have declined, with Guangdong only exporting three new infections over the weekend. The economic impact was becoming dramatic as shops, restaurants, markets, bars, universities, schools, and many other businesses had closed, while some government ministries and large state banks were working with minimal staff levels.

On 28 April, WHO declared the outbreak in Vietnam to be over as no new cases were reported for 20 days. On 29 April, leaders of member countries of ASEAN and the PRC premier held an emergency summit in Bangkok, Thailand to address the outbreak. Among the decisions made were the setting-up of a ministerial-level task force and uniform pre-departure health screening in airports.

On 30 April, the World Health Organization lifted the SARS travel warning for Toronto. The decision was made because "it is satisfied with local measures to stop the spread of SARS". Canadian officials said they would step up screenings at airports.

=== May 2003 ===
On 3 May, the 2003 FIFA Women's World Cup was abruptly moved to the United States due to the outbreak. China maintained its automatic qualification and later hosted the Women's World Cup four years later. On 4 May, the newly infected number of people in Hong Kong dropped to single digits. On 19 May, the WHO Annual Meeting was held in Geneva. Hong Kong pushed for the Tourism Warning to be lifted.

On 20 May, the WHO refused to lift the Tourism Warning for Hong Kong and Guangdong, but did so three days later after a recount of the number of SARS patients. On 24 May, the number of newly infected patients reached zero for in Hong Kong, the first time since the outbreak in the territory in March.

On 24 May, a new cluster of about 20 suspected patients was reported in Toronto. By 29 May, more than 7,000 people were instructed to quarantine themselves in Canada by authorities seeking to control the potential spread of the SARS outbreak.

In Taiwan, administrators and staff of Taipei Municipal Hospital's Hoping branch faced disciplinary action from the Taipei City Government. The Control Yuan also launched an investigation into the hospital's closure. Taipei City Bureau of Health director Chiu Shu-ti resigned from Ma Ying-jeou's mayoral administration on 25 May. On 27 May, the Taichung City Government, led by mayor Jason Hu, established a command center in central Taiwan to handle SARS. The Department of Health worked with several hospitals in Taiwan to expand medical facilities and treatment for SARS patients.

On 31 May, Singapore was removed from WHO's list of 'Infected Areas'.

=== June 2003 ===
On 10 June, the government of Ontario created the SARS Commission inquiry in order to "investigate the recent introduction and spread of SARS" in the province.

On 23 June, Hong Kong was removed from WHO's list of 'Affected Areas', while Toronto, Beijing, and Taiwan remained. On 27 June, the World Health Organization stated that the world population should be SARS-free within the next two to three weeks, but warned the disease could re-emerge in China the following winter.

=== July 2003 ===
On 2 July, Canada was removed from the WHO's list of 'Infected Areas'.

On 5 July, WHO declared the SARS outbreak contained and removed Taiwan from the list of affected areas. Taiwan's removal from the list signified the end of the outbreak.

=== September 2003 ===
On 8 September, Singapore announced that a post-doctoral worker in a SARS research lab in the National University of Singapore had contracted the disease while working on the West Nile virus but recovered shortly thereafter. It was suspected that the two viruses mixed while he was doing his research.

=== December 2003 ===
On 10 December, a researcher in a SARS lab in Taiwan was found infected with SARS after returning from Singapore attending a medical conference; 74 people in Singapore were quarantined but none of them were infected.

On 27 December, China announced the first suspected case of SARS in six months in Guangdong in an individual who was not a SARS researcher.

=== January 2004 ===
On 5 January, China confirmed that the case reported in December was a case of wild source SARS. The Philippines announced a possible case in a person just returned from Hong Kong. The patient was later determined to have had pneumonia and not SARS. In China, Asian palm civets were culled in markets (the civets were thought to be a reservoir for the disease).

On 10 January, a restaurant worker in Guangdong was confirmed as the second wild source SARS since the outbreak was contained. Guangzhou was also the site of the first case in December and was thought to be the origin of the virus in the original outbreak. Three Hong Kong television reporters who visited SARS-related sites in Guangzhou were declared free of the disease. On 17 January, China announced a third case of SARS in Guangzhou. WHO officials urged more testing to bring the three recently announced cases into line with their standards; however, they also announced SARS virus had been detected by a WHO team in civet cages at the restaurant where the second case worked and in civet cages in the market.

On 31 January, China announced the fourth case of SARS as a 40-year-old doctor from the southern city of Guangzhou, and gave his family name as Liu. He was discharged when the announcement was made.

=== April 2004 ===
SARS broke out again in Beijing and in Anhui Province. On 22 April, China announced that a 53-year-old woman had died on 19 April, its first SARS death since June. One person died and nine were infected in the outbreak which was first reported on 22 April. The first 2 infected cases involved a postgraduate student and a researcher at the National Institute for Viral Disease Control and Prevention (abbrev.: Institute of Virology) of the Chinese Center for Disease Control and Prevention; an additional 7 cases were diagnosed, which were linked with close personal contact with the student, the lab or with a nurse who treated the student.

=== May 2004 ===
Two additional confirmed cases of SARS and three additional suspected cases were reported in Beijing on 1 May, all related to a single research lab, the Diarrhea Virus Laboratory in the CDC's National Institute of Virology in Beijing. "The cases had been linked to experiments using live and inactive SARS coronavirus in the CDC's virology and diarrhea institutes where interdisciplinary research on the SARS virus was conducted." The total number of cases was six, with four in Beijing and two in Anhui.

On 2 May, China announced the three suspected cases as genuine cases of SARS, bringing the total cases in a recent outbreak to nine. 189 people were released from quarantine. On 18 May, after no new infections had been reported in a three-week period, WHO announced China as free of further cases of SARS, but stated that "biosafety concerns remain".

== Subsequent status ==
In May 2005, Jim Yardley of the New York Times wrote:

"Not a single case of the severe acute respiratory syndrome has been reported this year [2005] or in late 2004. It is the first winter without a case since the initial outbreak in late 2002. In addition, the epidemic strain of SARS that caused at least 774 deaths worldwide by June 2003 has not been seen outside of a laboratory since then."

== Policy impact ==
In China, the SARS epidemic resulted in substantial public criticism, prompted government statements that privatizing health care in rural China had been a failure, and brought rural reform to the top of the policy agenda.

Following the outbreak, China strengthened its reporting mechanisms for contagious diseases and reduced the reporting time from grassroots healthcare workers to the China Center for Disease Control and Prevention from 15 days to 4 hours.

== See also ==
- Aerosol
- Air pollution
- Indoor air quality
- List of medical professionals who died during the SARS outbreak
- Severe acute respiratory syndrome–related coronavirus
- COVID-19 pandemic
