= China National Highway 213 =

Road in China

National Highway 213
- 213国道

Route information
- Part of AH3
- Length: 2,827 km (1,757 mi)

Major junctions
- From: Ceke, Inner Mongolia in Inner Mongolia
- To: Mohan in Yunnan (Laos) Route 13

Location
- Country: China

Highway system
- National Trunk Highway System; Primary; Auxiliary
← G212	→ G214

China National Highway 213 (G213) runs from Ceke, Inner Mongolia, to Mohan, on the border with Laos, in Yunnan. It is 2,827 kilometres (1,757 mi) in length and runs via Chengdu, Sichuan and Kunming, Yunnan. Before the 2013 Highway Planning, the route started in Lanzhou, Gansu.

This route was a key transportation route into the disaster zone during the 2008 Wenchuan earthquake, and was referred to as a "lifeline" by rescue workers. On 6 July 2011, it was damaged by mudslides and collapses, including a 400-metre (1,300 ft) stretch which was damaged as a result of the nearby river being diverted by a mudslide.

For the extension to Ceke, a tunnel is being constructed on the 4,000-metre (13,000 ft) pass on the Gansu-Qinghai border near Sunan County.

== Route and distance ==
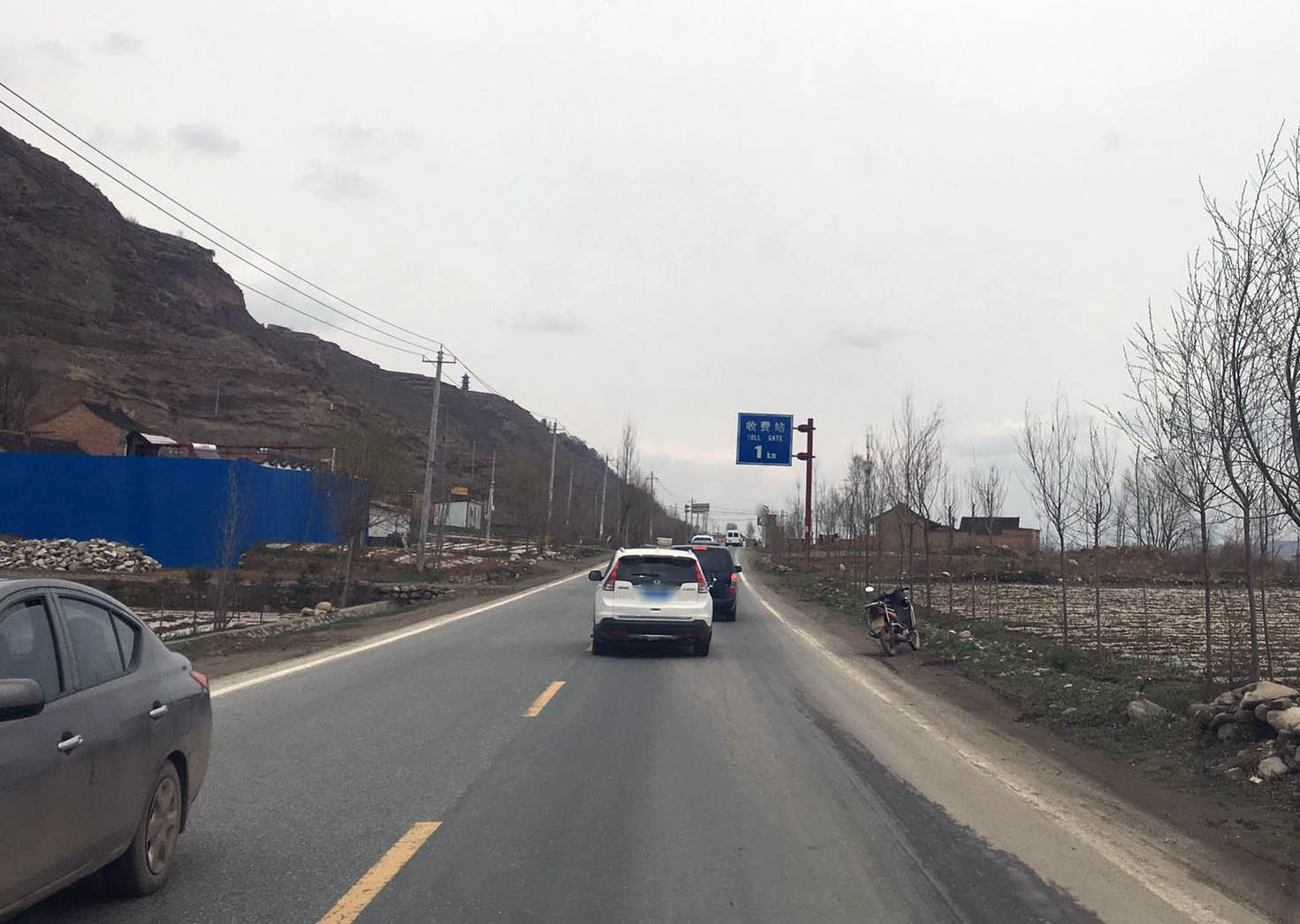
G213 near Linxia City, Gansu

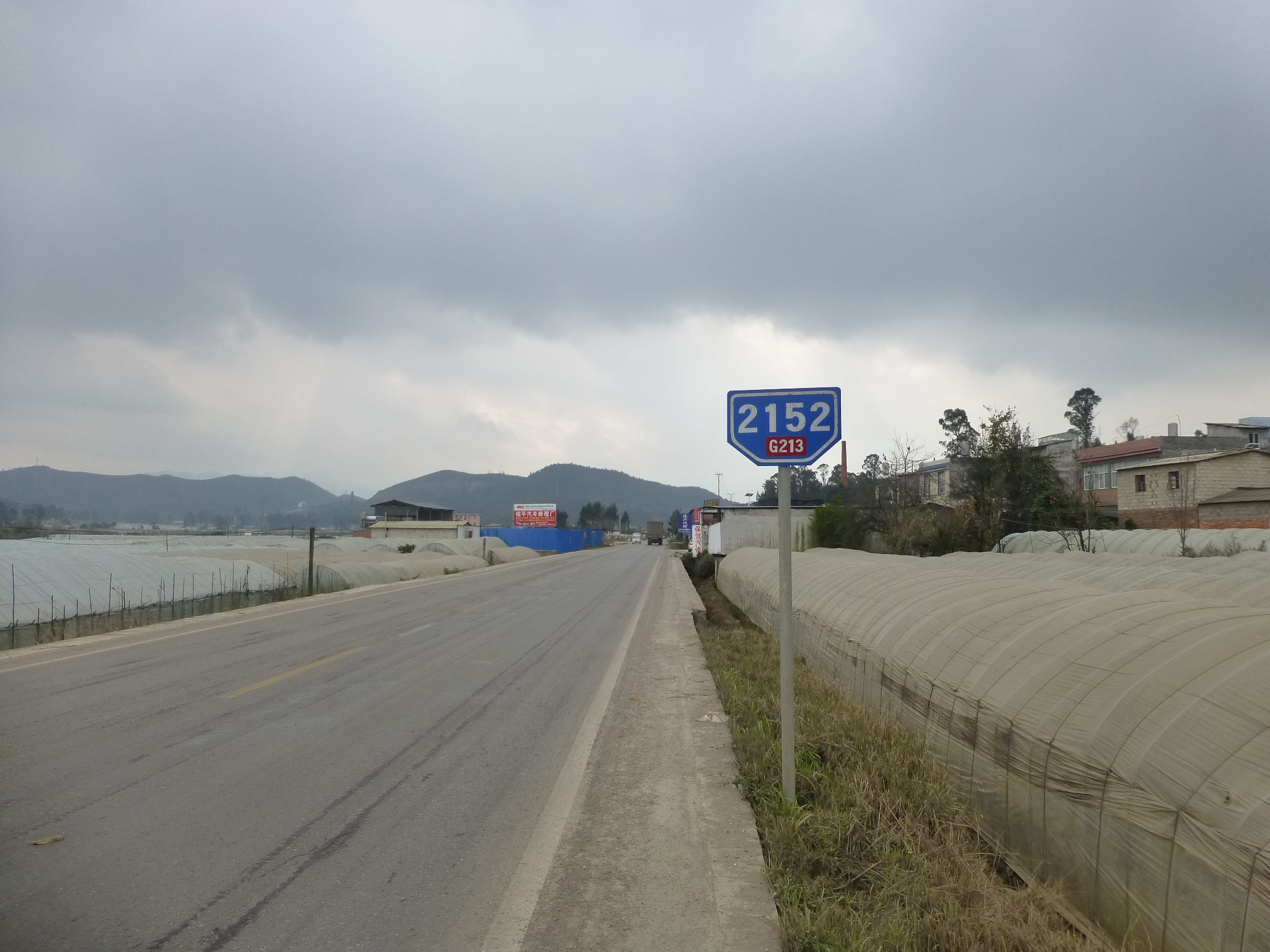
G213 in Kunyang, Jinning District, 2152 km from Lanzhou

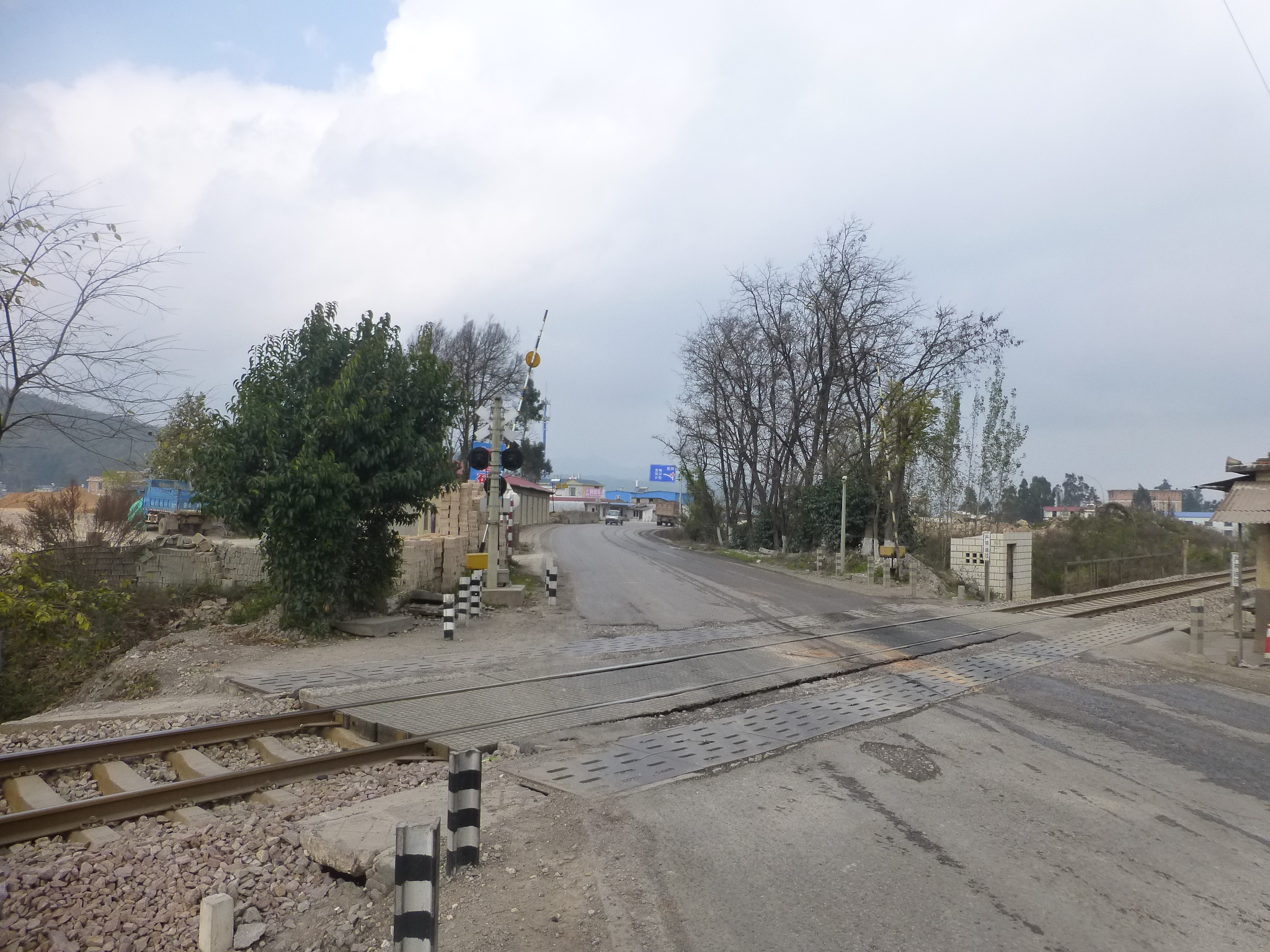
G213 crosses the old line of the Kunming–Yuxi Railway in Jinning District

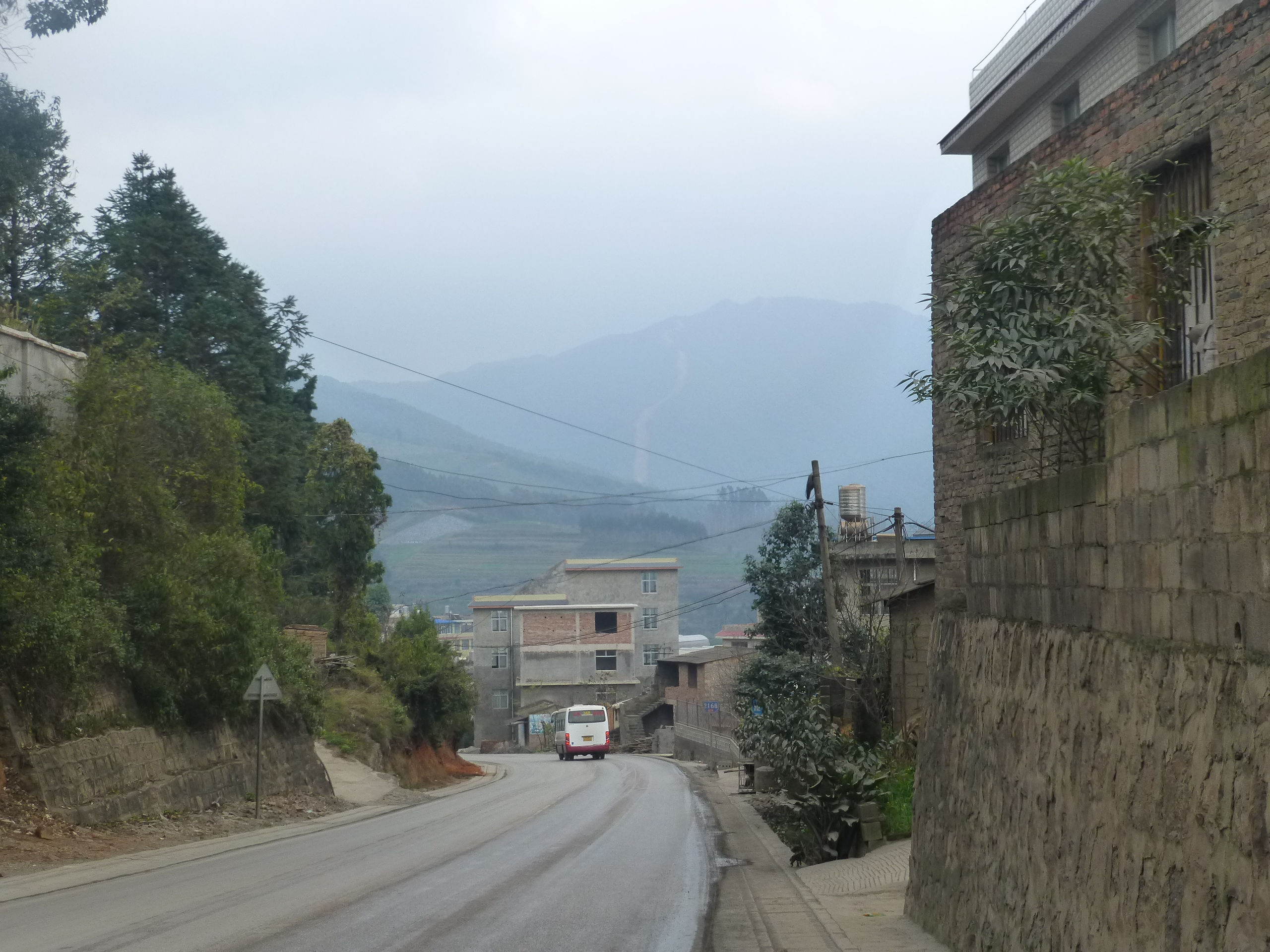
G213 in Hongta District, Yuxi, Yunnan

Route and distance

City	Distance (km)
Ceke, Inner Mongolia	
Jinta County, Gansu	
Jiuquan, Gansu	
Sunan Yugur Autonomous County, Gansu	
Lanzhou, Gansu	0
Yongjing, Gansu	70
Dongxiang Autonomous County, Gansu	133
Linxia, Gansu	160
Hezuo, Gansu	262
Luqu, Gansu	340
Zoige, Sichuan	506
Sungqu, Sichuan	671
Maoxian, Sichuan	813
Wenchuan, Sichuan	857
Dujiangyan, Sichuan	913
Pixian, Sichuan	947
Chengdu, Sichuan	967
Renshou, Sichuan	1064
Jingyan, Sichuan	1109
Wutongqiao, Sichuan	1142
Qianwei, Sichuan	1176
Muchuan, Sichuan	1220
Suijiang, Yunnan	1309
Daguan, Yunnan	1496
Zhaotong, Yunnan	1563
Huize, Yunnan	1699
Songming, Yunnan	1860
Kunming, Yunnan	1911
Chenggong, Yunnan	1931
Jinning, Yunnan	1967
Yuxi, Yunnan	2000
Eshan, Yunnan	2030
Yuanjiang, Yunnan	2159
Mojiang, Yunnan	2234
Ning'er, Yunnan	2395
Pu'er, Yunnan	2453
Jinghong, Yunnan	2615
Mengla, Yunnan	2774
Mohan, Yunnan	2827

== See also ==
- China National Highways
- AH3
