= Jinning, Kunming =

Coordinates: 24°40′00″N 102°35′30″E

Jinning 晋宁区
- District
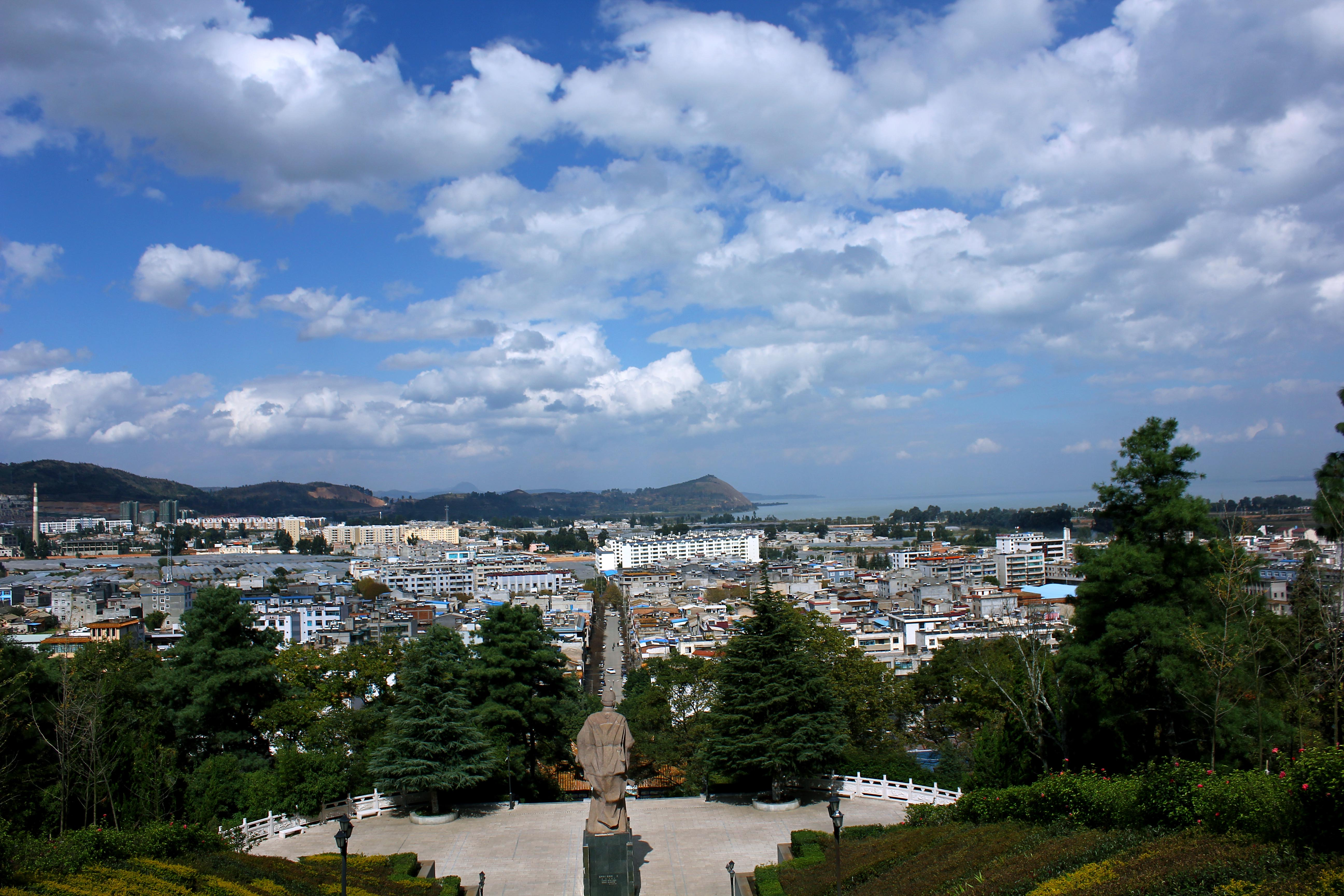
- Kunyang Town in Jinning

- Location of Jinning (red) and Kunming City (pink) in Yunnan province
- Country: People's Republic of China
- Province: Yunnan
- Prefecture: Kunming Prefecture
- Established: 1956

Area
  - Total: 1,230.86 km^{2} (475.24 sq mi)

Population (2020)
  - Total: 346,268
  - Density: 281.322/km^{2} (728.621/sq mi)
- Time zone: UTC+8 (CST)
- Postal code: 650600
- Area code: 0871
- Website: http://www.jinning.gov.cn/

Jinning District (simplified Chinese: 晋宁区; traditional Chinese: 晉寧區; pinyin: Jìnníng Qū) is one of seven districts of the prefecture-level city of Kunming, the capital of Yunnan Province in Southwest China. The formation of the district was approved on November 24, 2016, after the dissolution of the former Jinning County (晋宁县) by the State Council. It is located at the southern tip of Dian Lake and is well known within China as the birthplace of Zheng He.

Jinning District borders Chengjiang to the east, Hongta District and Jiangchuan District to the south, Anning, Yunnan, Eshan County and Yimen County to the west, and Xishan District and Chenggong District to the north.

== Nature ==
The southwestern "panhandle" of Jinning District (Xiyang Township, 夕阳乡) contains two caves (Yanzi and Shitou) known for their bat population. Starting from the early 2010s, researchers from the Wuhan Institute of Virology and EcoHealth Alliance carried out studies of viruses carried by those bats, discovering some that were fairly close to the Severe acute respiratory syndrome coronavirus. A 2018 study found antibodies to some of these bat viruses in the blood of a few villagers residing near the bat caves as well, indicating that some of them may have been exposed to bat coronaviruses.

== History ==
In 303 CE, during the Jin dynasty, Li Xiu became commander of the area after the abrupt death of her father, defeating a local rebellion after lasting a seven-year siege.

== Administrative divisions ==
Kunyang Town, Jincheng Town and Baofeng Town, Erjie Village, Shuanghe Yi Nationality Village, Xiyang Yi Nationality Village, Shangsuan Village, Xinjie Village and Lujie Village

== Ethnic groups ==
According to the Kunming City Almanac (1997:476), ethnic Hani are found in Gaoliangdi (高粱地) and Xiyang (夕阳) of Xiyang Yi Ethnic Township (夕阳乡), Jinning County.

== Climate ==
Climate data for Jinning, elevation 1,979 m (6,493 ft), (1991–2020 normals, extremes 1991–present)
Month	Jan	Feb	Mar	Apr	May	Jun	Jul	Aug	Sep	Oct	Nov	Dec	Year
Record high °C (°F)	23.9 (75.0)	26.9 (80.4)	29.3 (84.7)	30.9 (87.6)	32.6 (90.7)	33.2 (91.8)	30.6 (87.1)	30.8 (87.4)	29.7 (85.5)	27.4 (81.3)	26.2 (79.2)	24.6 (76.3)	33.2 (91.8)
Mean daily maximum °C (°F)	16.4 (61.5)	18.7 (65.7)	22.0 (71.6)	24.7 (76.5)	25.5 (77.9)	25.4 (77.7)	24.7 (76.5)	24.7 (76.5)	23.4 (74.1)	21.2 (70.2)	18.7 (65.7)	16.1 (61.0)	21.8 (71.2)
Daily mean °C (°F)	9.1 (48.4)	11.3 (52.3)	14.6 (58.3)	17.6 (63.7)	19.4 (66.9)	20.4 (68.7)	20.0 (68.0)	19.7 (67.5)	18.1 (64.6)	15.8 (60.4)	12.2 (54.0)	9.2 (48.6)	15.6 (60.1)
Mean daily minimum °C (°F)	4.1 (39.4)	5.7 (42.3)	8.8 (47.8)	11.8 (53.2)	14.7 (58.5)	16.9 (62.4)	17.0 (62.6)	16.5 (61.7)	14.9 (58.8)	12.5 (54.5)	7.9 (46.2)	4.7 (40.5)	11.3 (52.3)
Record low °C (°F)	−4.2 (24.4)	−2.5 (27.5)	−0.4 (31.3)	3.7 (38.7)	6.0 (42.8)	8.9 (48.0)	12.0 (53.6)	10.1 (50.2)	5.3 (41.5)	3.5 (38.3)	−0.9 (30.4)	−4.5 (23.9)	−4.5 (23.9)
Average precipitation mm (inches)	24.6 (0.97)	13.0 (0.51)	18.6 (0.73)	28.6 (1.13)	75.2 (2.96)	147.4 (5.80)	185.1 (7.29)	159.2 (6.27)	99.6 (3.92)	73.5 (2.89)	32.3 (1.27)	14.4 (0.57)	871.5 (34.31)
Average precipitation days (≥ 0.1 mm)	4.7	3.9	5.0	7.1	11.1	15.6	20.4	19.0	13.9	12.2	5.5	4.4	122.8
Average snowy days	0.7	0.3	0.3	0	0	0	0	0	0	0	0.1	0.3	1.7
Average relative humidity (%)	68	60	54	56	65	77	82	82	81	81	77	75	72
Mean monthly sunshine hours	229.3	234.8	265.3	263.1	226.9	158.7	133.1	148.7	136.6	155.0	202.5	205.9	2,359.9
Percentage possible sunshine	68	73	71	69	55	39	32	37	37	44	62	63	54
Source: China Meteorological Administrationall-time November record high

== Transport ==
- China National Highway 213

== Social issues ==
In October 2014, Fuyou village (Chinese: 富有村) was the scene of a violent clash between construction workers and villagers, leading to the deaths of eight people. The residents had been unhappy about a land deal related to the building of a trade and logistics centre.

== Monuments ==
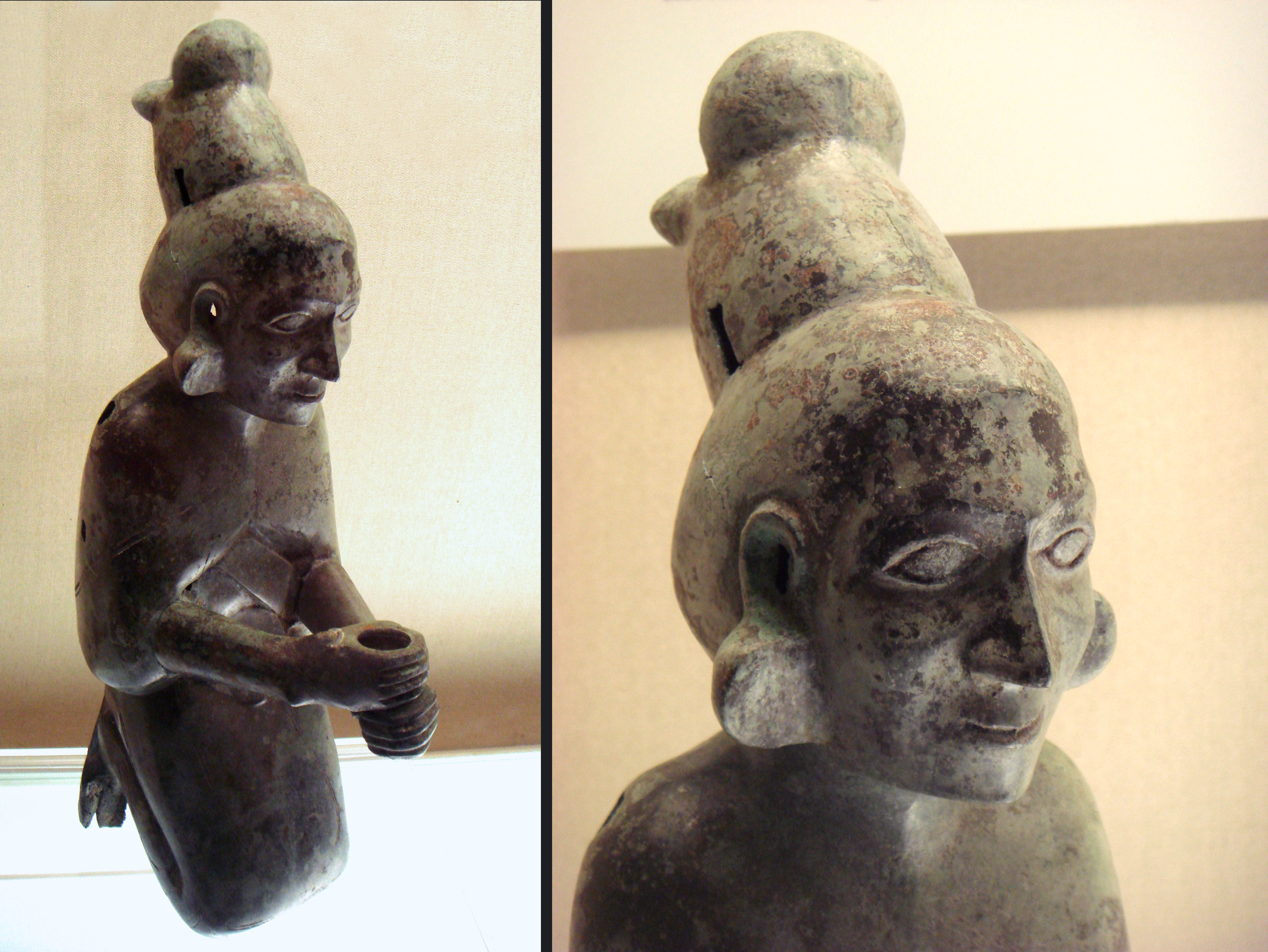
Dian Kingdom woman (246 BCE- 8 CE), excavated in Shizhaishan, Jinning (晋宁区石寨山). Shanghai Museum.

The Shizhaishan Tombs (Shizhaishan gumuqun 石寨山古墓群), and the grave of Ma station Hazhi (Ma Hazhi mubei 马哈只墓碑) in the greater community Kunyang, the father of Zheng He, are since 2001 and 2006 respectively on the list the monuments of the People's Republic of China.
