= Li Xiu =

4th-century Chinese Jin dynasty general

- 李秀

Personal details
- Born: 291 Santai County, Sichuan, China
- Relations: Li Zhao (brother)
- Parent: Li Yi (father)
- Courtesy name: Shuxian (淑贤)
- Posthumous name: Lady of Tranquil Pacification (镇靖夫人); Lady of Tranquil Pacification and Brilliant Wisdom (镇靖明惠夫人); Lady of Loyal and Brilliant Wisdom (忠烈明惠夫人)
- Other names: Yang Niang (楊娘)

Li Xiu (291–?), courtesy name Shuxian, was a Chinese military commander during the Jin dynasty (266–420). She is most known for leading the defence of Ning province (寧州; present-day Yunnan and Guizhou) against rebelling barbarian tribes for three years between 305 and 307. After her death, she became a popular deity among the people of Yunnan and was even honored by the emperors of the Sui and Tang dynasties.

== Life ==
=== Family and background ===
Li Xiu was born in Qi County (郪縣), Guanghan Commandery (廣漢郡; present-day Santai County, Sichuan) as the daughter of Li Yi (李毅) and sister of Li Zhao (李钊), both of whom were officials of the Western Jin dynasty. Her great-grandfather was Li Chao (李朝), celebrated as one of the "Three Dragons" of the Li clan, and she was married to Wang Zai (王载), who was also a Jin official.

=== Defense of Ning province ===
In 302, Li Yi, as Colonel of the Southern Man, quelled a revolt in Yi Province that was enticed by the Ba Di rebel, Li Te, after which he was appointed as the provincial Inspector of the newly-established Ning province. One of the revolt's instigators, Li Rui (李叡) managed to escape to the Wuling tribes (五苓夷), and in 303, the leader of the tribes, Yulingcheng (于陵丞) requested Li Yi that he pardon Li Rui. Li Yi pretended to agree, and when Li Rui arrived to receive his pardon, he had him killed instead. Yulingcheng was furious and led his tribes to attack Li Yi.

In the coming years, Ning was struck by a series of natural disasters that led to consecutive years of poor harvests, followed by the outbreak of an epidemic, killing a significant portion of the population. The Jin military in Ning suffered repeated defeats to the Wuling tribes, and many officials and civilians fled to Jiao province. As the tribes laid siege on the cities, Li Yi, who was seriously ill, could not lead the defense, and all routes for seeking external assistance were cut off. Despite sending an urgent plea to the imperial court, it took a few years before the court sent his son, Li Zhao from Luoyang to reinforce him, but by the time he arrived, Li Yi had already succumbed to his illness.

Li Xiu, who at the time was only 15 years old, was known for her intelligence and for possessing her father's qualities, so she was elected by the people of Ning as their leader after Li Yi's death. During her tenure, she would reward her warriors and withdraw into a city to mount a fierce defence. As the food supply in the city dwindled, her followers survived by eating rats and weeds. Li Xiu would wait for the tribes to grow complacent, and when they did, she would order her troops to sally out and rout the enemies. She also built a city in present-day Jinning, Yunnan, which was given the name Tiannücheng (天女城; "Citadel of the Heavenly Lady") by later generations.

Li Xiu and her people held out for three years before Li Zhao arrived in 307. She is no longer mentioned in official history from this point on, as she seemingly relinquished her position to her brother who was entrusted by the people of Ning to handle affairs in the province. After a few more years, the rebellion was eventually quelled by the new Inspector of Ning, Wang Xun. Both Li Zhao and Wang Zai later fought against the Cheng-Han dynasty as they encroached on Ning, but surrendered in 323 and were given offices under the new regime.

=== Zhonglie Ciji ===
The Zhonglie Ciji (忠烈祠記; Inscription of the Martyr), a 14th-century Yuan dynasty stele dedicated to Li Xiu, provides an apocryphal account of her life during and after her exploits in Ning province. The inscription asserts that Li Xiu personally donned armour and led the attack against the barbarians, even fully ascribing the rebellion's defeat to her. For her achievements, she was appointed the Inspector of Ning and Colonel of the Southern Man. She inherited her father's command over 37 tribes and served for more than 30 years, during which she kept the tribes in check, put the people at ease and maintained peace in the province. When she died in office, the people of Ning mourned as if they had lost a parent, and temples were built for her where they offer annual sacrifices.

== Legacy ==
The people of Ning revered Li Xiu as a divine figure and prayed to her for centuries after her death. Her popularity in Yunnan became known to Emperor Wen of the Sui dynasty, who posthumously honored her as "Lady of Tranquil Pacification" (镇靖夫人). When the Tang dynasty was first established in 618, the Inspector of Ning, Cuan Hongda (爨弘逵) was besieged by barbarians in his city. He went to a shrine of Li Xiu to pray for divine protection, and that night, a violent storm arose, which Cuan Hongda saw as a perfect opportunity. He launched a surprise attack and annihilated the besieging forces. He credited this victory to the spirit of Li Xiu, and Emperor Gaozu subsequently honored her with the title "Lady of Tranquil Pacification and Brilliant Wisdom." (镇靖明惠夫人). Under Emperor Xuanzong of Tang, her title was changed to "Lady of Loyal and Brilliant Wisdom" (忠烈明惠夫人) and her temple was given the name "Temple of the Martyr" (忠烈廟).

Her temple in Yunnan was the largest of its kind, built to the highest architectural standards. In 1331, during the Yuan dynasty, her temple was renovated, and the Zhonglie Ciji inscription was added to a stone tablet in front of the temple by Jia Ben (賈賁). The 17th-century Ming dynasty travel writer, Xu Xiake once visited the temple, but pointed out that the inscription wrongly stated that the temple was dedicated to a woman named Yang Niang (楊娘), when it should be Li Xiu.
