= Chenggong, Kunming =

Chenggong 呈贡区
- District
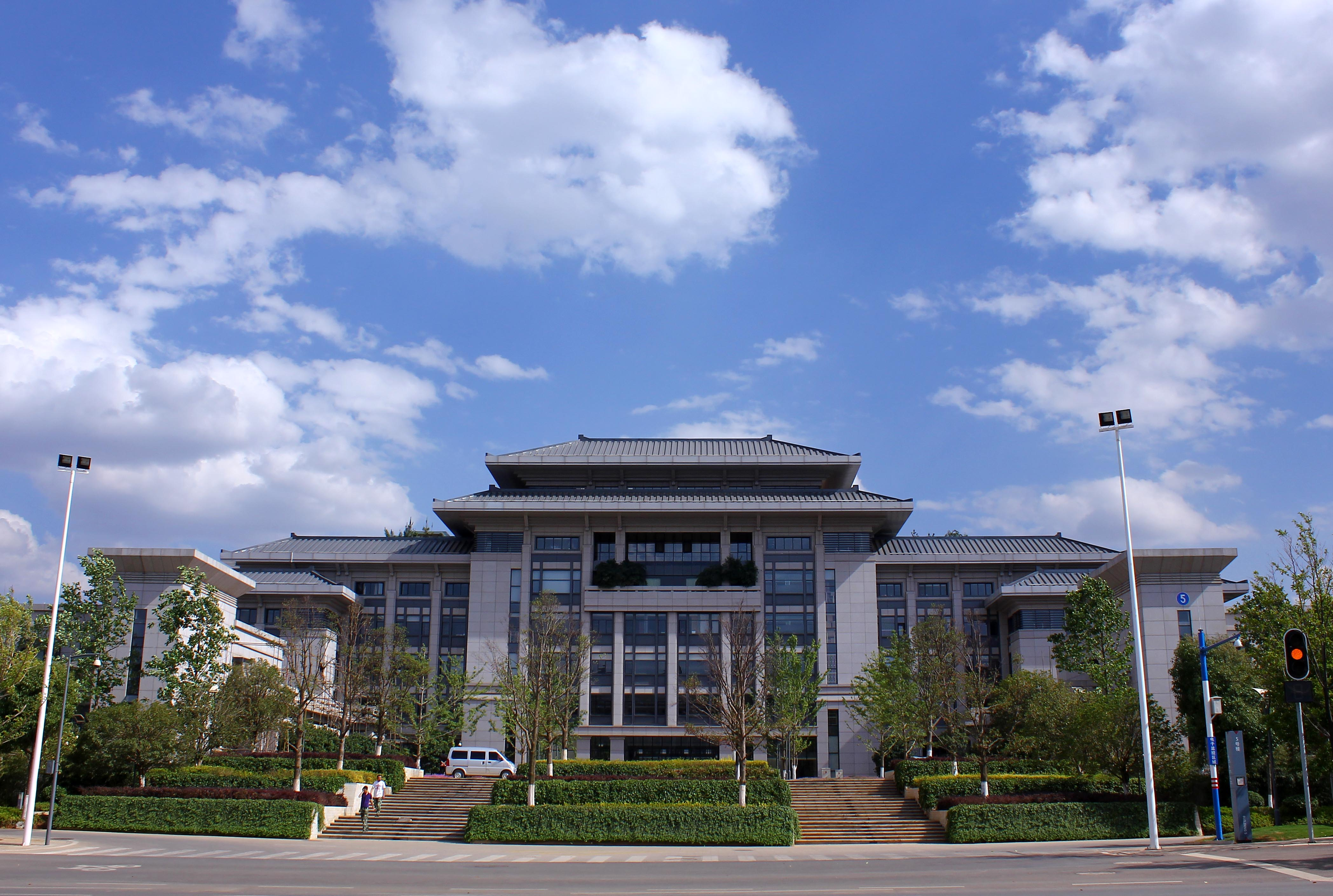
- New Kunming City Hall in Chenggong

- Location of Chenggong District (red) and Kunming City (pink) within Yunnan province
- Coordinates (Chenggong District government): 24°53′09″N 102°49′18″E
- Country: People's Republic of China
- Province: Yunnan
- Prefecture-level city: Kunming
- Established: 1956

Area
  - District: 461 km^{2} (178 sq mi)

Population (2023)
  - District: 709,700
  - Density: 1,540/km^{2} (3,990/sq mi)
  - Urban: 662,200
  - Rural: 47,500
- Time zone: UTC+8 (CST)
- Postal code: 650500
- Area code: 0871
- Website: www.yncg.gov.cn

Chenggong District (simplified Chinese: 呈贡区; traditional Chinese: 呈貢區; pinyin: Chénggòng Qū) is one of seven districts of the prefecture-level city of Kunming, the capital of Yunnan Province, Southwest China, situated on east bank of the Dian Lake. The name Chenggong is a transliteration of the word in Yi language for a basin where rice is grown.

== Geography ==
Chenggong is located in the southeast of Kunming and borders Yiliang County, Kunming to the east, Chengjiang and Jinning District to the south, Xishan District to the west and Guandu District to the north.

== History ==
It was first established in 1275. In 1961 it came under jurisdiction of Kunming city. In 2003 Chenggong was designated as a development zone of Kunming. The district was created from the dissolution of the former Chenggong County (呈贡县) by the State Council on May 20, 2011.

Chenggong is the chief zone for Kunming, the downtown of which is almost a 20-minute drive away. It is the site of the new Kunming City Hall, and new campuses for Yunnan University and Yunnan Normal University.

Early in the district's redevelopment, much of the newly constructed housing in Chenggong was unoccupied and was reportedly one of the largest ghost towns in Asia in 2012, in a similar situation to Ordos City and the New South China Mall. It has slowly become occupied, however, in more recent years as Central Kunming has become overcrowded. Some Government departments moved to Chenggong in 2012, and a subway line connecting Chenggong to the city centre opened in 2013. By 2017, the district had become home to many more offices and residents with more redevelopment still on the horizon.

== Administrative divisions ==
Chenggong District is divided into ten subdistricts.

Subdistricts
Longcheng (龙城街道), Luolong (洛龙街道), Dounan (斗南街道), Wulong (乌龙街道), Wujiaying (吴家营街道), Yuhua (雨花街道), Qidian (七甸街道), Luoyang (洛羊街道), Dayu (大渔街道) and Majinpu (马金铺街道)

== Climate ==
Climate data for Chenggong District, elevation 1,977 m (6,486 ft), (1991–2020 normals)
| Month | Jan | Feb | Mar | Apr | May | Jun | Jul | Aug | Sep | Oct | Nov | Dec | Year |
|---|---|---|---|---|---|---|---|---|---|---|---|---|---|
| Mean daily maximum °C (°F) | 15.7 (60.3) | 17.8 (64.0) | 21.2 (70.2) | 23.9 (75.0) | 25.0 (77.0) | 25.3 (77.5) | 24.7 (76.5) | 24.7 (76.5) | 23.2 (73.8) | 20.8 (69.4) | 18.4 (65.1) | 15.6 (60.1) | 21.4 (70.5) |
| Daily mean °C (°F) | 9.1 (48.4) | 11.1 (52.0) | 14.5 (58.1) | 17.5 (63.5) | 19.3 (66.7) | 20.4 (68.7) | 20.1 (68.2) | 19.8 (67.6) | 18.2 (64.8) | 15.8 (60.4) | 12.2 (54.0) | 9.1 (48.4) | 15.6 (60.1) |
| Mean daily minimum °C (°F) | 3.8 (38.8) | 5.7 (42.3) | 9.0 (48.2) | 12.0 (53.6) | 14.8 (58.6) | 16.9 (62.4) | 17.1 (62.8) | 16.5 (61.7) | 14.9 (58.8) | 12.3 (54.1) | 7.8 (46.0) | 4.3 (39.7) | 11.3 (52.3) |
| Average precipitation mm (inches) | 20.7 (0.81) | 11.9 (0.47) | 19.0 (0.75) | 25.3 (1.00) | 77.5 (3.05) | 145.3 (5.72) | 177.4 (6.98) | 145.4 (5.72) | 83.5 (3.29) | 71.5 (2.81) | 27.8 (1.09) | 14.4 (0.57) | 819.7 (32.26) |
| Average precipitation days (≥ 0.1 mm) | 4.4 | 3.4 | 4.7 | 6.6 | 10.7 | 14.9 | 18.6 | 17.7 | 12.8 | 11.2 | 5.3 | 3.8 | 114.1 |
| Average snowy days | 1.1 | 0.4 | 0.2 | 0 | 0 | 0 | 0 | 0 | 0 | 0 | 0.2 | 0.3 | 2.2 |
| Average relative humidity (%) | 68 | 61 | 56 | 57 | 65 | 75 | 80 | 79 | 79 | 79 | 75 | 73 | 71 |
| Mean monthly sunshine hours | 219.1 | 219.8 | 245.2 | 244.1 | 213.0 | 139.8 | 117.7 | 133.9 | 126.8 | 147.1 | 192.6 | 194.5 | 2,193.6 |
| Percentage possible sunshine | 65 | 69 | 66 | 64 | 51 | 34 | 28 | 34 | 35 | 41 | 59 | 59 | 50 |
Source: China Meteorological Administration

== Economy ==
Chenggong Industrial Park is among the 30 key industrial parks in Yunnan province, with a total planned area of 66.46 km^{2}.

Dounan, near Chenggong, has the largest flower market in China. The local flower-growing business started in the 1980s, and in 2013 Dounan now supplied more than half of China's cut flowers.

== Transport ==
- Kunming Changshui International Airport
- China National Highway 213
- Line 1 (Kunming Metro)
- Kunming South railway station

== See also ==
- List of cities in the People's Republic of China
- List of cities in the People's Republic of China by population
- List of top Chinese cities by GDP
- List of top Chinese cities by GDP per capita
