= Carlo Urbani =

Italian physician and microbiologist

- Urbani in Vietnam
- Born: 19 October 1956; Castelplanio, Italy
- Died: 29 March 2003 (aged 46); Bangkok, Thailand
- Cause of death: SARS
- Education: University of Ancona
- Known for: Identifying SARS
- Spouse: Giuliana Chiorrini
- Children: 3
- Medical career
- Profession: Physician
- Institutions: Médecins Sans Frontières; World Health Organization
- Research: Infectious diseases, parasitic diseases

Carlo Urbani (Italian: [ˈkarlo urˈbaːni]; 19 October 1956 – 29 March 2003) was an Italian physician and microbiologist and the first to identify severe acute respiratory syndrome (SARS) as probably a new and dangerously contagious viral disease, and his early warning to the World Health Organization (WHO) triggered a swift and global response credited with saving numerous lives. Shortly afterwards, he himself became infected and died.

== Medical career ==
Urbani graduated with a medical degree in 1981 from the University of Ancona and specialized in infectious and tropical diseases from the University of Messina. He subsequently earned a postgraduate degree in tropical parasitology.

Urbani started volunteering for the African endemic disease cause since young joining the Italian Catholic NGO Mani Tese. In 1987 Urbani went to Ethiopia for one month. In 1989 he was primary aide in the infectious diseases department of Macerata, Italy. After years working in the epidemic medicine field, in 1993 he became an external consultant of the World Health Organization.

In 1996, he joined Médecins Sans Frontières (MSF) and moved with his family to Phnom Penh, Cambodia for a year. Upon his return to his workplace in Macerata, he became president of the Italian section of MSF. He also helped launch a campaign against multinational pharmaceutical companies that keep up the price of indispensable medicines against AIDS, malaria and tuberculosis. In 1999 he was part of the delegation that received the Nobel Peace Prize awarded to MSF. With the prize money, Urbani decided to create a fund to promote an international campaign for access to essential medicines for the world's poorest populations.

== SARS outbreak ==
Back in Asia, Urbani was called into The French Hospital of Hanoi, Vietnam, in late February 2003 to look at an American patient, businessman Johnny Chen, who had fallen ill with what doctors thought was a bad case of influenza. Urbani realized that Chen's ailment was probably a new and highly contagious disease. He immediately notified the WHO, triggering a response to the epidemic (principally isolation and quarantine measures) that ended it within five months. He also persuaded the Vietnamese Health Ministry to begin isolating patients and screening travelers, thus slowing the early pace of the epidemic.

On 11 March 2003, as he flew from Hanoi to a conference in Bangkok, Thailand, where he was to talk on the subject of childhood parasites, Urbani started feeling feverish. A colleague who met him at the airport called an ambulance. Urbani had contracted SARS while treating infected patients in Hanoi. His Bangkok hospital room became an improvised isolation ward, and communication occurred via an intercom. As his lungs weakened, he was put on a ventilator. During a moment of consciousness, Urbani asked for a priest to give him last rites and asked for his lung tissue to be donated for scientific research. Urbani died on 29 March 2003, after 18 days of intensive care.

SARS-CoV Urbani strain later became the reference variant of this outbreak.

== Personal life ==
Urbani married Giuliana Chiorrini in 1983, and in 1987 their first child, Tommaso, was born. He had two more children.

== Honours ==
=== National honours ===

Cavaliere dell'Ordine della Stella d'Italia 3rd Class / Knight: 28 May 2020

Medaglia d'oro per i benemeriti della Sanità Pubblica: 7 April 2003

=== Foreign honours ===
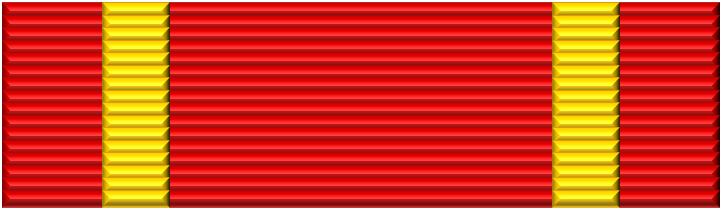
- Friendship Order: 7 April 2003
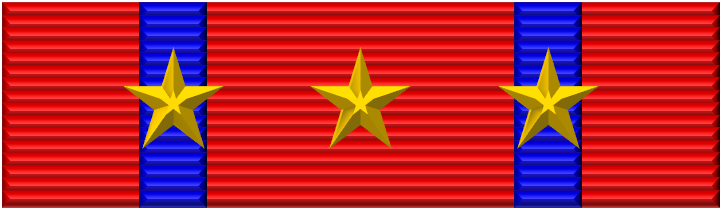
- Labor Order: 12 May 2003

== See also ==
- Li Wenliang, was reprimanded for warning colleagues about the COVID-19 pandemic and later died from the virus.
- Liu Jianlun, Chinese doctor who died from the virus SARS-CoV-1, is believed to have been a super-spreader during an event in Hong Kong.
