= Leo Poon =

Hong Kong virologist and academic

Leo Poon Lit-man (潘烈文) is the Head of the Division of Public Health Laboratory Science of the University of Hong Kong. In July 2020, Professor Malik Peiris stepped down from the position of co-director of the joint research pole between Hong Kong University and the Pasteur Institute (HKU-Pasteur), and Professor Leo Poon succeeded to this crucial WHO recognized Centre. He is one of the worlds' leading scientists investigating the emergence of viral diseases transferring from animals to humans, such as new strains of Influenza viruses and coronaviruses. Along with colleagues in his Division, he has made major contributions to the understanding of disease causes, diagnostic testing, and epidemiological control of these pandemic viral diseases.

== Personal life ==
Poon was born in the then British colony of Hong Kong and is a citizen of the Special Administration Region of Hong Kong in China, where he has lived continuously, apart from the three years of post graduate study in Oxford in England.

== Academic career ==
Poon took his BSc from the Hong Kong Baptist University, followed by the MPhil at the Chinese University of Hong Kong. Then he proceeded to the University of Oxford in the UK, at the Sir William Dunn School of Pathology, where he completed his doctorate thesis during 1996 to 1999, and was awarded the DPhil degree. He has been awarded the Fellowship of the UK Faculty of Public Health, FFPH. He has over 400 published research items, and over 60 patents, mainly in the field of clinical virology of Influenza virus and Coronaviruses. He is an editor of the Oxford Academic Journals publication, Virus Evolution. Malik Peiris, an internationally renowned virologist, is an influential mentor, colleague and collaborator in Poon's academic and scientific career.

=== Coronaviruses ===
Poon, along with his colleague Malik Peiris, published a definitive research publication on the Coronavirus 2019 virus in the Journal Nature Medicine. The team also first published the WHO technical protocol for the identification of the virus. At the onset of the first major outbreak in 2003 of epidemic Coronavirus, Severe Acute Respiratory Syndrome (SARS), the Hong Kong team of virologists published a landmark article in the same Journal. In the ensuing period, they have published numerous contributions to basic virological understanding of coronaviruses, to clinical and laboratory diagnosis, to public health and epidemiology and have listed many patents.

=== Influenza viruses ===
Poon studies the replication and transmission of strains of emerging Influenza viruses, and has also developed molecular tests for their laboratory diagnosis. These have included epidemic avian influenzas such as H5N1, pandemic H1N1/2009 and H7N9. He made an active contribution to demonstrate the reassortment of the pandemic H1N1 virus in pigs. He currently focuses on studying the basic molecular biology, epidemiology and vaccinology of influenza viruses.

=== International panels and committees ===
Poon is a participant in international scientific and administrative committees and panels:

- International Committee on Taxonomy of Viruses – Coronaviruses Study Group
- The WHO Expert Group on Influenza Molecular Diagnistics Methods

=== Books ===
Detection of SARS Coronaviruses (2011), Malik Peiris and Leo Poon, Springer Verlag. DOI: 10.1007/978-1-60761-817-1_20

=== In popular media ===
Poon and his pioneering contribution to the study of Influenza and Coronaviruses was featured in the Hong Kong publication of the magazine Time Out in February 2017.

CNN Health ran an extended broadcast on Coronavirus19 on 18 February which featured Poon's work.
