= Xiyang Yi Ethnic Township =

Xiyang Yi Ethnic Township 夕阳彝族乡
- Ethnic township
- Location in Yunnan
- Coordinates: 24.460811°N 102.289155°E
- Country: People's Republic of China
- Province: Yunnan
- Prefecture-level city: Kunming
- District: Jinning (became a district from 2016)
- Time zone: UTC+8 (China Standard)

Xiyang Yi Ethnic Township (Yi script:?, Chinese: 夕阳彝族乡) is an ethnic township in Jinning District, Yunnan.

== Demographics and Languages ==
Among its 10,155 residents, 78% (7,921) are ethnic minorities in China, chiefly Yi people (Lolo) and Hani people, as of 2006. Nuosu language, being one of the Lolo-Burmese languages, is most spoken there.

== Geography ==
Xiyang is 55 kilometres (34 mi) away from the Jinning County seat, deep in the mountains, with 60.86% forest cover. Its highest point Leida Hill (雷打山) stands at 2,563 metres (8,409 ft) tall, while its lowest point Xiaoshiban river (小石板河) is at 1,340 metres (4,400 ft). It has an average annual temperature of 16.8C, annual precipitation of 891.8mm and annual sunshine hours of 2278.5.
