= 昆陽 =

昆陽 may refer to:

- Gonyang-myeon (곤양면; 昆陽面), Sacheon, South Gyeongsang Province, South Korea
- Aoki Konyō (1698 – 1769), Confucian scholar, minor hatamoto and pioneer rangaku scholar in early Edo period Japan
- Kunyang, Chinese town, once in Battle of Kunyang, located in what is today Kunyang Town, Ye County, Pingdingshan, Henan province, China

== See also ==
- The dictionary definition of 昆 at Wiktionary
- The dictionary definition of 陽 at Wiktionary
