= Kunyang Subdistrict =

Kunyang Subdistrict 昆阳街道
- Subdistrict
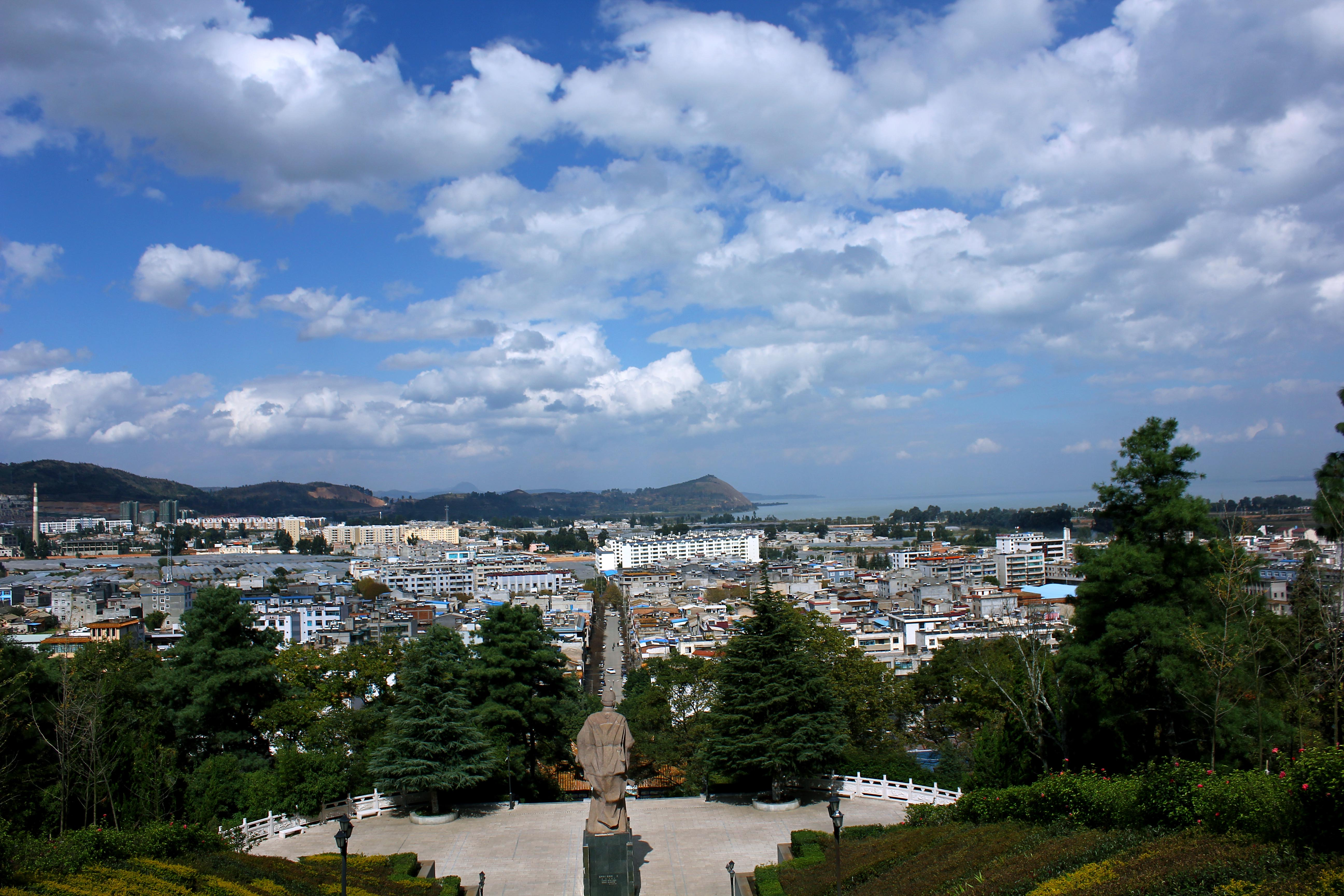

- Location within Yunnan
- Coordinates: 24°40′06″N 102°35′27″E
- Country: China
- Province: Yunnan
- Prefecture-level city: Kunming
- County: Jinning County

Area
  - Total: 119.79 km^{2} (46.25 sq mi)

Population
  - Total: 83,500
  - Density: 697/km^{2} (1,810/sq mi)
- Time zone: UTC+8 (China Standard)
- Postal code: 650600
- Area code: 0871

Kunyang Subdistrict (Chinese: 昆阳街道; pinyin: Kūnyáng Jiēdào) is a subdistrict and the administrative center of Jinning District, Yunnan, China. It is situated southwest of Dianchi (Dian Lake), with a resident population of 83,500 within its total area of 119.79 square kilometres.

Until 2016, Kunyang was a town, and the county seat of Jinning County. Due to the increasing urbanization of the area, the county was renamed into a district, and its towns, including Kunyang, became subdistricts.

Kunyang is the birthplace of Chinese explorer Zheng He, who is now commemorated by a series of memorials in Zheng He Park, on top of Kunyang's Moon Mountain (Yue Shan).

Kunyang contains some of the largest phosphorus resources in Yunnan which in turn has the largest in China.
