= Hôpital français de Hanoï =

Geography
- Location: 1 Phuong Mai, Dong Da, Hanoi, Vietnam
- Coordinates: 21°0′13″N 105°50′27″E

Organisation
- Care system: Private

Services
- Emergency department: Yes
- Beds: 90

History
- Founded: 1997

Links
- Website: www.hfh.com.vn/en/home/
- Lists: Hospitals in Vietnam

The Hôpital français de Hanoï (English: French Hospital of Hanoi, Vietnamese: Bệnh viện Pháp của Hà Nội), known in Vietnam under the name Bệnh viện Việt Pháp, formerly the Viet Nam International Hospital, is a privatised hospital in Hanoi, Vietnam, sold to a French company in September 2000. It is located at 1 Phuong Mai, Dong Da, Hanoi. Its staff include French and Vietnamese doctors.

== History ==
The hospital was founded in 1997, as the Vietnam International Hospital, a joint venture between Bach Mai Hospital and an Australian company. In January 2000, the Australian company

sold their share to French company Eukaria S.A. In September 2000 it was 100% privatised. It used to be the only international hospital in Vietnam.[citation needed]

== Services ==
They provide the following services: Accident & Emergency, Maternity, Ear–Nose–Throat & Cervico-Maxillo Facial Surgery, Orthopedics & Traumatology, Urology, Gastroenterology, Visceral Surgery, Neurosurgery, Ophthalmology, Cosmetic & Plastic surgery, and Dentistry. 170 bed

== Specialties ==
- Anesthesiology & Acute Pain Management
- Clinical & Interventional Cardiology
- Dentalcare & Orthodontics
- Dermatology & Venereology
- Diagnostic imaging
- ENT: Ear, Nose, Throat
- Gastroenterology
- General medicine
- Neurosurgery
- Neurology
- Ophthalmology
- Orthopaedics & Traumatology
- Pediatrics
- Pneumology & Allergology
- Obstetrics & Gynaecology
- Counselling & Psychiatry
- Urology
- Visceral surgery
- Medical imaging

== See also ==
- List of hospitals in Vietnam
