= COVID-19 misinformation =

False or misleading virus information

Disinfodemic – Deciphering COVID-19 disinformation, published by UNESCO

False information, including disinformation and conspiracy theories about the scale of the COVID-19 pandemic and the origin, prevention, diagnosis, and treatment of the disease has been spread through social media, text messaging, and mass media. False information has been propagated by celebrities, politicians, and other prominent public figures. Many countries have passed laws against "fake news", and thousands of people have been arrested for spreading COVID-19 misinformation. The spread of COVID-19 misinformation by governments has also been significant.

Commercial scams have claimed to offer at-home tests, supposed preventives, and "miracle" cures. Several religious groups have claimed their faith will protect them from the virus. Without evidence, some people have claimed the virus is a bioweapon accidentally or deliberately leaked from a laboratory, a population control scheme, the result of a spy operation, or the side effect of 5G upgrades to cellular networks.

The World Health Organization (WHO) declared an "infodemic" of incorrect information about the virus that poses risks to global health. While belief in conspiracy theories is not a new phenomenon, in the context of the COVID-19 pandemic, this can lead to adverse health effects. Cognitive biases, such as jumping to conclusions and confirmation bias, may be linked to the occurrence of conspiracy beliefs. Uncertainty among experts, when combined with a lack of understanding of the scientific process by laypeople, has likewise been a factor amplifying conspiracy theories about the COVID-19 pandemic. In addition to health effects, harms resulting from the spread of misinformation and endorsement of conspiracy theories include increasing distrust of news organizations and medical authorities as well as divisiveness and political fragmentation.

== Overview ==
In January 2020, the BBC reported on the developing issue of conspiracy theories and bad health advice regarding COVID-19. Examples at the time included false health advice shared on social media and private chats, as well as conspiracy theories such as the outbreak being planned with the participation of the Pirbright Institute. In January, The Guardian listed seven instances of misinformation, adding the conspiracy theories about bioweapons and the link to 5G technology, and including varied false health advice.

In an attempt to speed up research sharing, many researchers have turned to preprint servers such as arXiv, bioRxiv, medRxiv, and SSRN. Papers are uploaded to these servers without peer review or any other editorial process that ensures research quality. Some of these papers have contributed to the spread of conspiracy theories. Preprints about COVID-19 have been extensively shared online and some data suggest that they have been used by the media almost 10 times more than preprints on other topics.

According to a study published by the Reuters Institute for the Study of Journalism, most misinformation related to COVID-19 involves "various forms of reconfiguration, where existing and often true information is spun, twisted, recontextualised, or reworked"; less misinformation "was completely fabricated". The study also found that "top-down misinformation from politicians, celebrities, and other prominent public figures", while accounting for a minority of the samples, captured a majority of the social media engagement. According to their classification, the largest category of misinformation (39%) was "misleading or false claims about the actions or policies of public authorities, including government and international bodies like the WHO or the UN".

In addition to social media, television and radio have been perceived as sources of misinformation. In the early stages of the COVID-19 pandemic in the United States, Fox News adopted an editorial line that the emergency response to the pandemic was politically motivated or otherwise unwarranted, and presenter Sean Hannity claimed on-air that the pandemic was a "hoax" (he later issued a denial). When evaluated by media analysts, the effect of broadcast misinformation has been found to influence health outcomes in the population. In a natural experiment (an experiment that takes place spontaneously, without human design or intervention), two similar television news programs that were shown on the Fox News network in February–March 2020 were compared. One program reported the effects of COVID-19 more seriously, while a second program downplayed the threat of COVID-19. The study found that audiences who were exposed to the news downplaying the threat were statistically more susceptible to increased COVID-19 infection rates and death. In August 2021, television broadcaster Sky News Australia was criticised for posting videos on YouTube containing misleading medical claims about COVID-19. Conservative talk radio in the US has also been perceived as a source of inaccurate or misleading commentary on COVID-19. In August and September 2021, several radio hosts who had discouraged COVID-19 vaccination, or expressed scepticism toward the COVID-19 vaccine, subsequently died from COVID-19 complications, among them Dick Farrel, Phil Valentine and Bob Enyart.

Misinformation on the subject of COVID-19 has been used by politicians, interest groups, and state actors in many countries for political purposes: to avoid responsibility, scapegoat other countries, and avoid criticism of their earlier decisions. Sometimes there is a financial motive as well. Multiple countries have been accused of spreading disinformation with state-backed operations in the social media in other countries to generate panic, sow distrust, and undermine democratic debate in other countries, or to promote their models of government.

A Cornell University study of 38 million articles in English-language media around the world found that US President Donald Trump was the single largest driver of the misinformation. Analysis published by National Public Radio in December 2021 found that as American counties showed higher vote shares for Trump in 2020, COVID-19 vaccination rates significantly decreased and death rates significantly increased. NPR attributed the findings to misinformation.

== Virus origin ==
The consensus among virologists is that the most likely origin of the SARS-CoV-2 virus to be natural crossover from animals, having spilled-over into the human population from bats, possibly through an intermediate animal host, although the exact transmission pathway has not been determined. Genomic evidence suggests an ancestor virus of SARS-CoV-2 originated in horseshoe bats.

An alternative hypothesis under investigation, deemed unlikely by the majority of virologists given a lack of evidence, is that the virus may have accidentally escaped from the Wuhan Institute of Virology in the course of standard research. A poll in July 2021 found that 52% of US adults believe COVID-19 escaped from a lab.

Unsubstantiated speculation and conspiracy theories related to this topic gained popularity during the pandemic. Common conspiracy theories state that the virus was intentionally engineered, either as a bio-weapon or to profit from the sale of vaccines. According to the World Health Organization, genetic manipulation has been ruled out by genomic analysis. Many other origin stories have also been told, ranging from claims of secret plots by political opponents to a conspiracy theory about mobile phones. In March 2020, the Pew Research Center found that a third of Americans believed COVID-19 had been created in a lab, and a quarter thought it had been engineered intentionally. The spread of these conspiracy theories is magnified through mutual distrust and animosity, as well as nationalism and the use of propaganda campaigns for political purposes.

The promotion of misinformation has been used by American far-right groups such as QAnon, by rightwing outlets such as Fox News, by US President Donald Trump and also other prominent Republicans to stoke anti-China sentiments, and has led to increased anti-Asian activity on social media and in the real world. This has also resulted in the bullying of scientists and public health officials, both online and in-person, fuelled by a highly political and oftentimes toxic debate on many issues. Such spread of misinformation and conspiracy theories has the potential to negatively affect public health and diminish trust in governments and medical professionals.

The resurgence of the lab leak and other theories was fuelled in part by the publication, in May 2021, of early emails between National Institute of Allergy and Infectious Diseases (NIAID) director Anthony Fauci and scientists discussing the issue. Per the emails in question, Kristian Andersen (author of one study debunking genomic manipulation theories) had examined the possibility, and emailed Fauci proposing possible mechanisms, before ruling out deliberate manipulation. These emails were later misconstrued and used by critics to claim a conspiracy was occurring. The ensuing controversy became known as the "Proximal Origin". However, despite claims to the contrary in some US newspapers, no new evidence has surfaced to support any theory of a laboratory accident, and the majority of peer-reviewed research points to a natural origin. This parallels previous outbreaks of novel diseases, such as HIV, SARS and H1N1, which have also been the subject of allegations of laboratory origin.

=== Wuhan lab origin ===
==== Bio-weapon ====
One early source of the bio-weapon origin theory was former Israeli secret service officer Dany Shoham, who gave an interview to The Washington Times about the biosafety level 4 (BSL-4) laboratory at the Wuhan Institute of Virology. A scientist from Hong Kong, Li-Meng Yan, fled China and released a preprint stating the virus was modified in a lab rather than having a natural evolution. In an ad hoc peer-review (as the paper was not submitted for traditional peer review as part of the standard scientific publishing process), her claims were labelled as misleading, unscientific, and an unethical promotion of "essentially conspiracy theories that are not founded in fact". Yan's paper was funded by the Rule of Law Society and the Rule of Law Foundation, two non-profits linked to Steve Bannon, a former Trump strategist, and Guo Wengui, an expatriate Chinese billionaire. This misinformation was further seized on by the American far-right, who have been known to promote distrust of China. In effect, this formed "a fast-growing echo chamber for misinformation". The idea of SARS-CoV-2 as a lab-engineered weapon is an element of the Plandemic conspiracy theory, which proposes that it was deliberately released by China.

The Epoch Times, an anti-Chinese Communist Party (CCP) newspaper affiliated with Falun Gong, has spread misinformation related to the COVID-19 pandemic in print and via social media including Facebook and YouTube. It has promoted anti-CCP rhetoric and conspiracy theories around the coronavirus outbreak, for example through an 8-page special edition called "How the Chinese Communist Party Endangered the World", which was distributed unsolicited in April 2020 to mail customers in areas of the United States, Canada, and Australia. In the newspaper, the SARS-CoV-2 virus is known as the "CCP virus", and a commentary in the newspaper posed the question, "is the novel coronavirus outbreak in Wuhan an accident occasioned by weaponizing the virus at that [Wuhan P4 virology] lab?" The paper's editorial board suggested that COVID-19 patients cure themselves by "condemning the CCP" and "maybe a miracle will happen".

In response to the propagation of theories in the US of a Wuhan lab origin, the Chinese government promulgated the conspiracy theory that the virus was developed by the United States army at Fort Detrick. The conspiracy theory was also promoted by British MP Andrew Bridgen in March 2023.

In 2025, the official White House website under the Donald Trump administration claimed that the COVID-19 virus emerged as a result of a leak in a Chinese laboratory.

==== Gain-of-function research ====
One idea used to support a laboratory origin invokes previous gain-of-function research on coronaviruses. Virologist Angela Rasmussen argued that this is unlikely, due to the intense scrutiny and government oversight gain-of-function research is subject to, and that it is improbable that research on hard-to-obtain coronaviruses could occur under the radar. The exact meaning of "gain of function" is disputed among experts.

In May 2020, Fox News host Tucker Carlson accused Anthony Fauci of having "funded the creation of COVID" through gain-of-function research at the Wuhan Institute of Virology (WIV). Citing an essay by science writer Nicholas Wade, Carlson alleged that Fauci had directed research to make bat viruses more infectious to humans. In a hearing the next day, US senator Rand Paul alleged that the US National Institutes of Health (NIH) had been funding gain-of-function research in Wuhan, accusing researchers including epidemiologist Ralph Baric of creating "super-viruses". Both Fauci and NIH Director Francis Collins have denied that the US government supported such research. Baric likewise rejected Paul's allegations, saying that his lab's research into the potential in bat coronaviruses for cross-species transmission was not deemed gain-of-function by NIH or the University of North Carolina, where he works.

A 2017 study of chimeric bat coronaviruses at the WIV listed NIH as a sponsor; however, NIH funding was only related to sample collection. Based on this and other evidence, The Washington Post rated the claim of an NIH connection to gain-of-function research on coronaviruses as "two pinocchios", representing "significant omissions and/or exaggerations".

==== Accidental release of collected sample ====
Another theory suggests the virus arose in humans from an accidental infection of laboratory workers by a natural sample. Unfounded online speculation about this scenario has been widespread.

In March 2021, an investigatory report released by the WHO described this scenario as "extremely unlikely" and not supported by any available evidence. The report acknowledged, however, that the possibility cannot be ruled out without further evidence. The investigation behind this report operated as a joint collaboration between Chinese and international scientists. At the release briefing for the report, WHO Director-General Tedros Adhanom Ghebreyesus reiterated the report's calls for a deeper probe into all evaluated possibilities, including the laboratory origin scenario. The study and report were criticised by heads of state from the US, the EU, and other WHO member countries for a lack of transparency and incomplete access to data. Further investigations have also been requested by some scientists, including Anthony Fauci and signatories of a letter published in Science.

Since May 2021, some media organizations softened previous language that described the laboratory leak theory as "debunked" or a "conspiracy theory". On the other hand, scientific opinion that an accidental leak is possible, but unlikely, has remained steady. A number of journalists and scientists have said that they dismissed or avoided discussing the lab leak theory during the first year of the pandemic as a result of perceived polarization resulting from Donald Trump's embrace of the theory.

=== Stolen from Canadian lab ===
Some social media users have alleged that COVID-19 was stolen from a Canadian virus research lab by Chinese scientists. Health Canada and the Public Health Agency of Canada said that this had "no factual basis". The stories seem to have been derived from a July 2019 CBC news article stating that some Chinese researchers had their security access to the National Microbiology Laboratory in Winnipeg, a Level 4 virology lab, revoked after a Royal Canadian Mounted Police investigation. Canadian officials described this as an administrative matter and said there was no risk to the Canadian public.

Responding to the conspiracy theories, the CBC stated that its articles "never claimed the two scientists were spies, or that they brought any version of [a] coronavirus to the lab in Wuhan". While pathogen samples were transferred from the lab in Winnipeg to Beijing in March 2019, neither of the samples contained a coronavirus. The Public Health Agency of Canada has stated that the shipment conformed to all federal policies, and that the researchers in question are still under investigation, and thus it cannot be confirmed nor denied that these two were responsible for sending the shipment. The location of the researchers under investigation by the Royal Canadian Mounted Police has also not been released.

In a January 2020 press conference, NATO secretary-general Jens Stoltenberg, when asked about the case, stated that he could not comment specifically on it, but expressed concerns about "increased efforts by the nations to spy on NATO allies in different ways".

=== Accusations by China ===
According to The Economist, conspiracy theories exist on China's internet about COVID-19 being created by the CIA in order to "keep China down". According to an investigation by ProPublica, such conspiracy theories and disinformation have been propagated under the direction of China News Service, the country's second largest government-owned media outlet controlled by the United Front Work Department. Global Times and Xinhua News Agency have similarly been implicated in propagating disinformation related to COVID-19's origins. NBC News however has noted that there have also been debunking efforts of US-related conspiracy theories posted online, with a WeChat search of "Coronavirus [disease 2019] is from the U.S." reported to mostly yield articles explaining why such claims are unreasonable. (Note: Multiple conspiracy articles in Chinese from the SARS era resurfaced during the outbreak with altered details, claiming SARS is biological warfare. Some said BGI Group from China sold genetic information of the Chinese people to the US, which then specifically targeted the genome of Chinese individuals. In January 2020, Chinese military enthusiast website Xilu published an article, claimed how the US artificially combined the virus to "precisely target Chinese people." The article was removed in early February. The article was further distorted on social media in Taiwan, which claimed "Top Chinese military website admitted novel coronavirus was Chinese-made bioweapon." Taiwan Fact-check center debunked the original article and its divergence, suggesting the original Xilu article distorted the conclusion from a legitimate research on Chinese scientific magazine Science China Life Sciences, which never mentioned the virus was engineered. The fact-check center explained Xilu is a military enthusiastic tabloid established by a private company, thus it does not represent the voice of Chinese military. Some articles on popular sites in China have also cast suspicion on US military athletes participating in the Wuhan 2019 Military World Games, which lasted until the end of October 2019, and have suggested they deployed the virus. They claim the inattentive attitude and disproportionately below-average results of American athletes in the games indicate they might have been there for other purposes and they might actually be bio-warfare operatives. Such posts stated that their place of residence during their stay in Wuhan was also close to the Huanan Seafood Wholesale Market, where the first known cluster of cases occurred. In March 2020, this conspiracy theory was endorsed by Zhao Lijian, a spokesperson from the Ministry of Foreign Affairs of the People's Republic of China. In March 2020, the US government summoned Chinese Ambassador Cui Tiankai to Washington over the coronavirus conspiracy theory. Over the next month, conspiracy theorists narrowed their focus to one US Army Reservist, a woman who participated in the games in Wuhan as a cyclist, claiming she is "patient zero." According to a CNN report, these theories have been spread by George Webb, who has nearly 100,000 followers on YouTube, and have been amplified by Chinese Communist Party media, for example the CPC-owned newspaper Global Times.)

In March 2020, two spokesmen for the Chinese Ministry of Foreign Affairs, Zhao Lijian and Geng Shuang, alleged at a press conference that Western powers may have "bio-engineered" COVID-19. They were alluding that the US Army created and spread COVID-19, allegedly during the 2019 Military World Games in Wuhan, where numerous cases of influenza-like illness were reported.

A member of the U.S. military athletics delegation based at Fort Belvoir, who competed in the 50mi Road Race at the Wuhan games, became the subject of online targeting by netizens accusing her of being "patient zero" of the COVID-19 outbreak in Wuhan, and was later interviewed by CNN, to clear her name from the "false accusations in starting the pandemic".

In January 2021, Hua Chunying renewed the conspiracy theory from Zhao Lijian and Geng Shuang that the SARS-CoV-2 virus originating in the United States at the U.S. biological weapons lab Fort Detrick. This conspiracy theory quickly went trending on the Chinese social media platform Weibo, and Hua Chunying continued to cite evidence on Twitter, while asking the government of the United States to open up Fort Detrick for further investigation to determine if it is the source of the SARS-CoV-2 virus. In August 2021, a Chinese Foreign Ministry spokesman repeatedly used an official podium to elevate the Fort Detrick's origin unproven idea.

According to a report from Foreign Policy, Chinese diplomats and government officials in concert with China's propaganda apparatus and covert networks of online agitators and influencers have responded, focused on repeating Zhao Lijian's allegation relating to Fort Detrick in Maryland, and the "over 200 U.S. biolabs" around the world. In April 2025, the Chinese government "restated its case that COVID-19 may have originated in the United States" according to Reuters.

=== Accusations by Russia ===
In February 2020, US officials alleged that Russia is behind an ongoing disinformation campaign, using thousands of social media accounts on Twitter, Facebook and Instagram to deliberately promote unfounded conspiracy theories, claiming the virus is a biological weapon manufactured by the CIA and the US is waging economic war on China using the virus. (Note: The acting assistant secretary of state for Europe and Eurasia, Philip Reeker, said "Russia's intent is to sow discord and undermine U.S. institutions and alliances from within" and "by spreading disinformation about coronavirus, Russian malign actors are once again choosing to threaten public safety by distracting from the global health response." Russia denies the allegation, saying "this is a deliberately false story." According to US-based The National Interest magazine, although official Russian channels had been muted on pushing the US biowarfare conspiracy theory, other Russian media elements do not share the Kremlin's restraint. Zvezda, a news outlet funded by the Russian Defense Ministry, published an article titled "Coronavirus: American biological warfare against Russia and China", claiming that the virus is intended to damage the Chinese economy, weakening its hand in the next round of trade negotiations. Ultra-nationalist politician and leader of the Liberal Democratic Party of Russia, Vladimir Zhirinovsky, claimed on a Moscow radio station that the virus was an experiment by the Pentagon and pharmaceutical companies. Politician Igor Nikulin made rounds on Russian television and news media, arguing that Wuhan was chosen for the attack because the presence of a BSL-4 virus lab provided a cover story for the Pentagon and CIA about a Chinese bio-experiment leak. An EU-document claims 80 attempts by Russian media to spread disinformation related to the epidemic. According to the East StratCom Task Force, the Russian-funded Sputnik news agency had published stories speculating that the virus could have been invented in Latvia (by a Latvian affiliate), that it was used by Chinese Communist Party to curb protests in Hong Kong, that it was introduced intentionally to reduce the number of elder people in Italy, that it was targeted against the Yellow Vests movement, and making many other speculations. Sputnik branches in countries including Armenia, Belarus, Spain, and in the Middle East came up with versions of these stories.)

In March 2022, amid the 2022 Russian invasion of Ukraine, the Russian Defense Ministry stated that US President Joe Biden's son, Hunter Biden, as well as billionaire George Soros, were closely tied to Ukrainian biolabs. American right-wing media personalities, such as Tucker Carlson, highlighted the story, while Chinese Communist Party-owned tabloid Global Times further stated that the labs had been studying bat coronaviruses, which spread widely on the Chinese internet for insinuating that the United States had created SARS-CoV-19 in Ukrainian laboratories.

=== Accusations by other countries ===
According to Washington, DC-based nonprofit Middle East Media Research Institute, numerous writers in the Arabic press have promoted the conspiracy theory that COVID-19, as well as SARS and the swine flu virus, were deliberately created and spread to sell vaccines against these diseases, and it is "part of an economic and psychological war waged by the U.S. against China with the aim of weakening it and presenting it as a backward country and a source of diseases". (Note: Iraqi political analyst Sabah Al-Akili on Al-Etejah TV, Saudi daily Al-Watan writer Sa'ud Al-Shehry, Syrian daily Al-Thawra columnist Hussein Saqer, and Egyptian journalist Ahmad Rif'at on Egyptian news website Vetogate, were some examples given by MEMRI as propagators of the US biowarfare conspiracy theory in the Arabic world.)

Accusations in Turkey of Americans creating the virus as a weapon have been reported, and a YouGov poll from August 2020 found that 37% of Turkish respondents believed the US government was responsible for creating and spreading the virus.

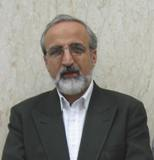
Reza Malekzadeh, Iran's deputy health minister, rejected bioterrorism theories.

An Iranian cleric in Qom said Donald Trump targeted the city with coronavirus "to damage its culture and honor". Several figures associated with the ruling government also claimed that COVID-19 was a "biological attack" by the U.S. against China and Iran. (Note: According to Radio Farda, Iranian cleric Seyyed Mohammad Saeedi accused US President Donald Trump of targeting Qom with coronavirus "to damage its culture and honor." Saeedi claimed that Trump is fulfilling his promise to hit Iranian cultural sites, if Iranians took revenge for the airstrike that killed of Quds Force Commander Qasem Soleimani. Iranian TV personality Ali Akbar Raefipour claimed the coronavirus was part of a "hybrid warfare" programme waged by the United States on Iran and China. Brigadier General Gholam Reza Jalali, head of Iranian Civil Defense Organization, claimed the coronavirus is likely a biological attack on China and Iran with economic goals. Hossein Salami, the head of Islamic Revolutionary Guard Corps (IRGC), claimed that the COVID-19 pandemic in Iran may be due to a US "biological attack." Several Iranian politicians, including Hossein Amir-Abdollahian, Rasoul Falahati, Alireza Panahian, Abolfazl Hasanbeigi and Gholamali Jafarzadeh Imanabadi, also made similar remarks. Iranian Supreme Leader, the Ayatollah Ali Khamenei, made similar suggestions. Former Iranian president Mahmoud Ahmadinejad sent a letter to the United Nations in March 2020, claiming that "it is clear to the world that the mutated coronavirus was produced in lab" and that COVID-19 is "a new weapon for establishing and/or maintaining political and economic upper hand in the global arena." The late Ayatollah Hashem Bathaie Golpayegani claimed that "America is the source of coronavirus, because America went head to head with China and realised it cannot keep up with it economically or militarily." Reza Malekzadeh, Iran's deputy health minister and former Minister of Health, rejected claims that the virus was a biological weapon, pointing out that the US would be suffering heavily from it. He said Iran was hard-hit because its close ties to China and reluctance to cut air ties introduced the virus, and because early cases had been mistaken for influenza.) Reza Malekzadeh, Iran's deputy health minister and former Minister of Health, said it was "highly unlikely" that the virus was a biological weapon, noting that the US would be suffering heavily from it. He said Iran was hard-hit because its close ties to China and reluctance to cut air ties introduced the virus, and because early cases had been mistaken for influenza.

In Iraq, pro-Iranian social media users waged a Twitter campaign during Trump's Presidency to end U.S. presence in the country by blaming it for the virus. The campaign centered around hashtags such as #Bases_of_the_American_pandemic and #Coronavirus_is_Trump's_weapon. A March 2020 survey by USCENTCOM found that 67% of Iraqi respondents believed a foreign force was behind COVID-19, with 72% of them naming the USA as that force.

Theories blaming the USA have also circulated in the Philippines, (Note: A Filipino Senator, Tito Sotto, played a bioweapon conspiracy video in a February 2020 Senate hearing, suggesting the coronavirus is biowarfare waged against China.) Venezuela (Note: Venezuela Constituent Assembly member Elvis Méndez declared that the coronavirus was a "bacteriological sickness created in '89, in '90 and historically" and that it was a sickness "inoculated by the gringos." Méndez theorized that the virus was a weapon against Latin America and China and that its purpose was "to demoralize the person, to weaken to install their system." President Nicolás Maduro made similar claims, claiming that the epidemic was a biological weapon targeted at China.) and Pakistan. An October 2020 Globsec poll of Eastern European countries found that 38% of respondents in Montenegro and Serbia, 37% of those in North Macedonia, and 33% in Bulgaria believed the USA deliberately created COVID-19.

=== Jewish origin ===
==== In the Muslim world ====
Iran's Press TV asserted that "Zionist elements developed a deadlier strain of coronavirus against Iran." Similarly, some Arab media outlets accused Israel and the United States of creating and spreading COVID-19, avian flu, and SARS. Users on social media offered other theories, including the allegation that Jews had manufactured COVID-19 to precipitate a global stock market collapse and thereby profit via insider trading, while a guest on Turkish television posited a more ambitious scenario in which Jews and Zionists had created COVID-19, avian flu, and Crimean–Congo hemorrhagic fever to "design the world, seize countries, [and] neuter the world's population". Turkish politician Fatih Erbakan reportedly said in a speech: "Though we do not have certain evidence, this virus serves Zionism's goals of decreasing the number of people and preventing it from increasing, and important research expresses this."

Israeli attempts to develop a COVID-19 vaccine prompted negative reactions in Iran. Grand Ayatollah Naser Makarem Shirazi denied initial reports that he had ruled that a Zionist-made vaccine would be halal, and one Press TV journalist tweeted that "I'd rather take my chances with the virus than consume an Israeli vaccine." A columnist for the Turkish Yeni Akit asserted that such a vaccine could be a ruse to carry out mass sterilization.

==== In the United States ====
An alert by the US Federal Bureau of Investigation regarding the possible threat of far-right extremists intentionally spreading COVID-19 mentioned blame being assigned to Jews and Jewish leaders for causing the pandemic and several statewide shutdowns.

==== In Germany ====
Flyers have been found on German tram cars, falsely blaming Jews for the pandemic.

In April 2022, two members of the Reichsbürger movement (later implicated in the 2022 German coup d'état plot) were charged with conspiring to kidnap the German health minister Karl Lauterbach.

==== In Britain ====
According to a study carried out by the University of Oxford in early 2020, nearly one-fifth of respondents in England believed to some extent that Jews were responsible for creating or spreading the virus with the motive of financial gain.

=== Muslims spreading virus ===
In India, Muslims have been blamed for spreading infection following the emergence of cases linked to a Tablighi Jamaat religious gathering. There are reports of vilification of Muslims on social media and attacks on individuals in India. Claims have been made that Muslims are selling food contaminated with SARS-CoV-2 and that a mosque in Patna was sheltering people from Italy and Iran. These claims were shown to be false. In the UK, there are reports of far-right groups blaming Muslims for the pandemic and falsely claiming that mosques remained open after the national ban on large gatherings.

=== Population-control scheme ===
According to the BBC, Jordan Sather, a YouTuber supporting the QAnon conspiracy theory and the anti-vax movement, has falsely claimed that the outbreak was a population-control scheme created by the Pirbright Institute in England and by former Microsoft CEO Bill Gates.

In mid-2020, a hoax spread on social media claiming that World Bank documents showed that they had been planning pandemic measures since 2017 or 2018, even though the documents did not mention COVID-19 until they were updated after the pandemic began. A similar hoax also spread at the same time, which involved an alleged test to detect COVID-19 patented by the Rothschild family in 2015, even though in reality the patent did not mention COVID-19 at all before 2020, and it was only updated after the pandemic began.

Piers Corbyn was described as "dangerous" by physician and broadcaster Hilary Jones during their joint interview on Good Morning Britain in early September 2020. Corbyn described COVID-19 as a "psychological operation to close down the economy in the interests of mega-corporations" and stated "vaccines cause death".

=== 5G mobile networks ===
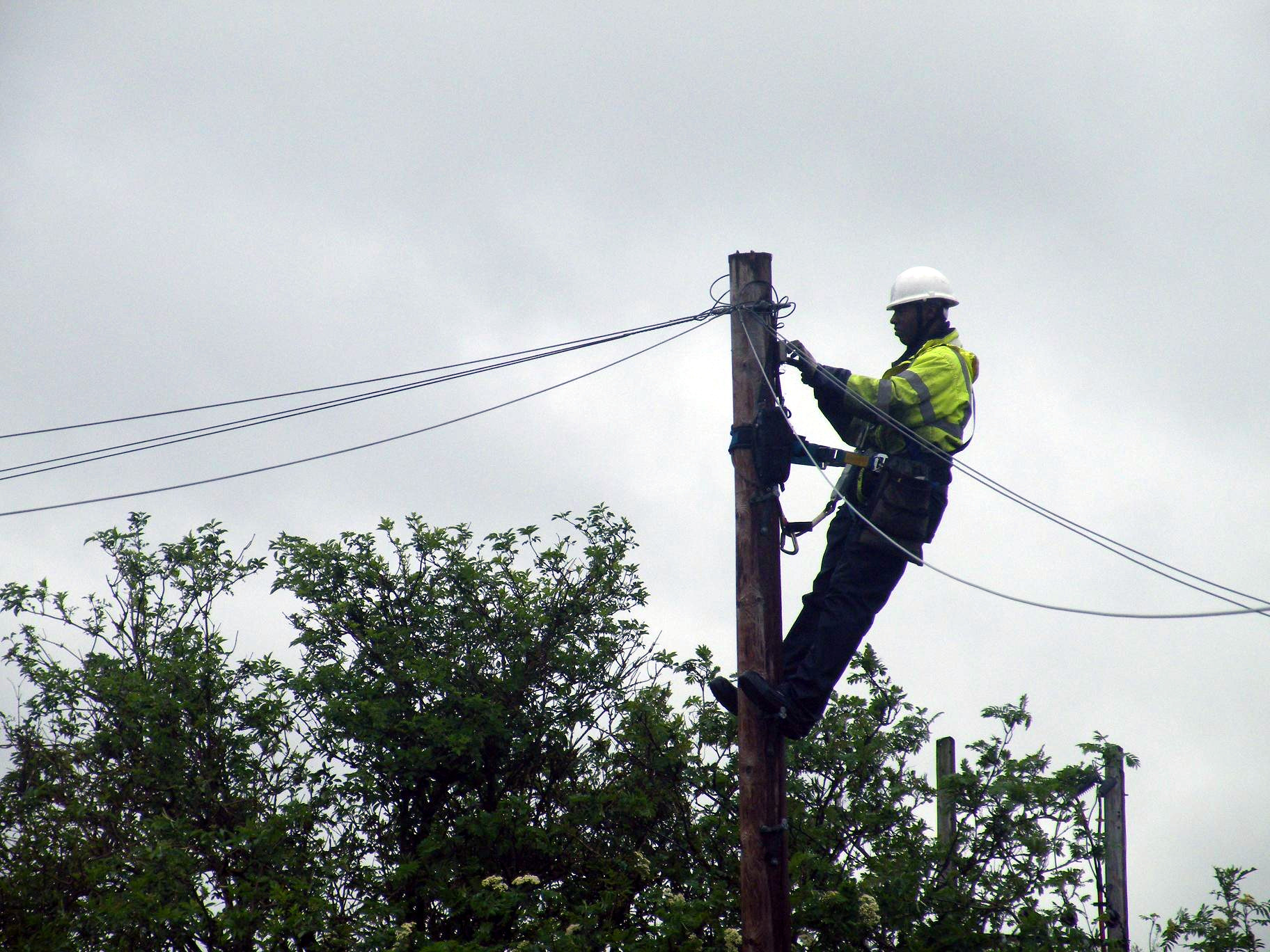
Openreach engineers appealed on anti-5G Facebook groups, saying they are not involved in mobile networks, and workplace abuse is making it difficult for them to maintain phonelines and broadband.

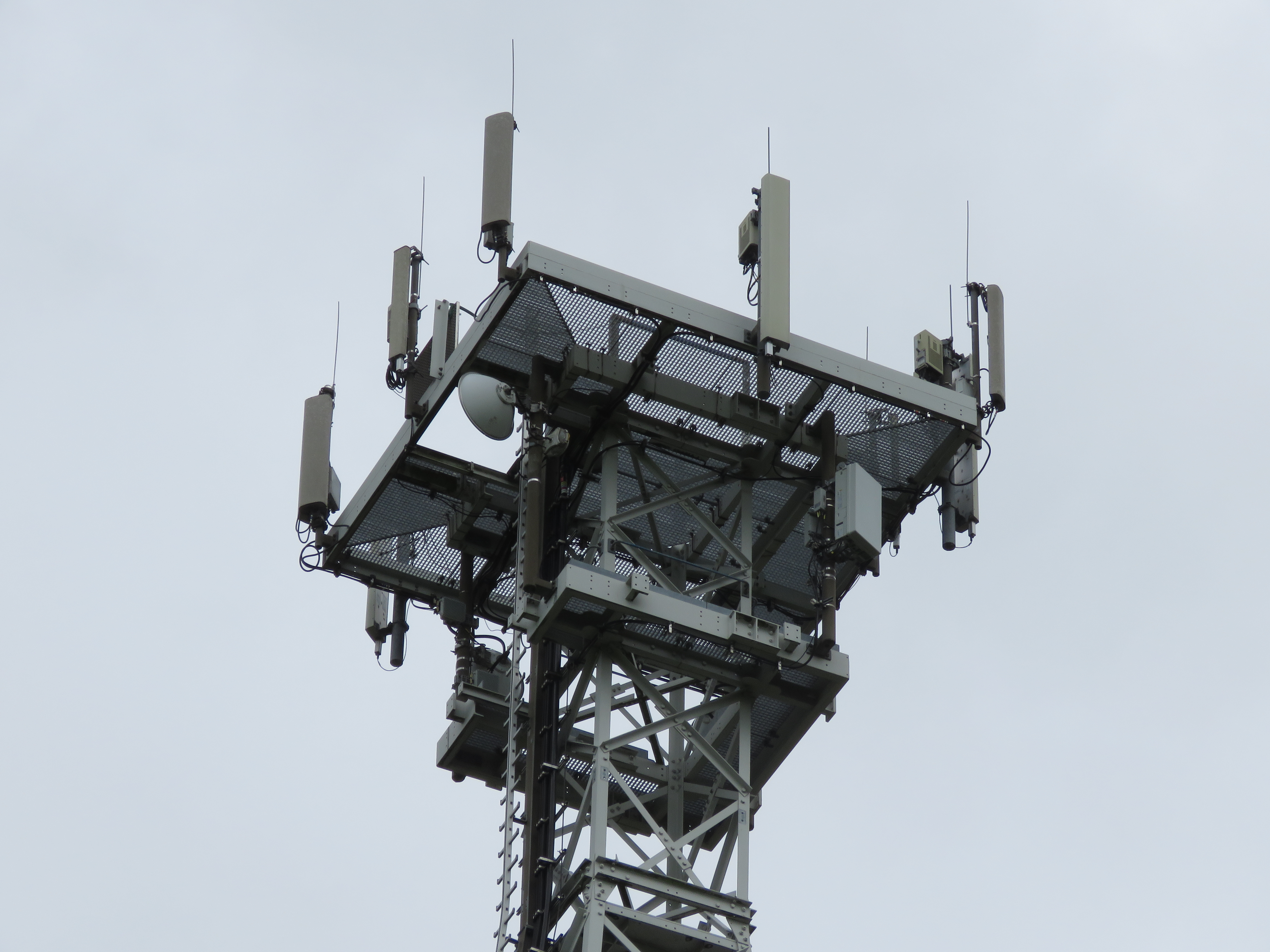
5G towers have been burned by people falsely blaming them for COVID-19.

The first conspiracy theories purporting a link between COVID-19 and 5G mobile networks had already appeared by the end of January 2020. Such claims spread rapidly on social media networks, leading to the spread of misinformation in what has been likened to a "digital wildfire".

In March 2020, Thomas Cowan, a holistic medical practitioner who trained as a physician and operates on probation with the Medical Board of California, alleged that COVID-19 is caused by 5G. He based this on the claims that African countries had not been affected significantly by the pandemic and Africa was not a 5G region. Cowan also falsely alleged that the viruses were waste from cells that were poisoned by electromagnetic fields, and that historical viral pandemics coincided with major developments in radio technology.

The video of Cowan's claims went viral and was recirculated by celebrities, including Woody Harrelson, John Cusack, and singer Keri Hilson. The claims may also have been recirculated by an alleged "coordinated disinformation campaign", similar to campaigns used by the Internet Research Agency in Saint Petersburg, Russia. The claims were criticized on social media and debunked by Reuters, USA Today, Full Fact and American Public Health Association executive director Georges C. Benjamin.

Cowan's claims were repeated by Mark Steele, a conspiracy theorist who claimed to have first-hand knowledge that 5G was in fact a weapon system capable of causing symptoms identical to those produced by the virus. Kate Shemirani, a former nurse who had been struck off the UK nursing registry and had become a promoter of conspiracy theories, repeatedly claimed that these symptoms were identical to those produced by exposure to electromagnetic fields.

Steve Powis, national medical director of NHS England, described theories linking 5G mobile-phone networks to COVID-19 as the "worst kind of fake news". Viruses cannot be transmitted by radio waves, and COVID-19 has spread and continues to spread in many countries that do not have 5G networks.

There were 20 suspected arson attacks on phone masts in the UK over the 2020 Easter weekend. These included an incident in Dagenham where three men were arrested on suspicion of arson, a fire in Huddersfield that affected a mast used by emergency services, and a fire in a mast that provides mobile connectivity to the NHS Nightingale Hospital Birmingham. Some telecom engineers reported threats of violence, including threats to stab and murder them, by individuals who believe them to be working on 5G networks. In April 2020, Gardaí and fire services were called to fires at 5G masts in County Donegal, Ireland. The Gardaí were treating the fires as arson. After the arson attacks, British Cabinet Office Minister Michael Gove said the theory that COVID-19 virus may be spread by 5G wireless communication is "just nonsense, dangerous nonsense as well". Telecommunications provider Vodafone announced that two Vodafone masts and two it shares with O2, another provider, had been targeted.

By April 2020, at least 20 mobile-phone masts in the UK had been vandalised. Because of the slow rollout of 5G in the UK, many of the damaged masts had only 3G and 4G equipment. Mobile-phone and home broadband operators estimated there were at least 30 incidents where engineers maintaining equipment were confronted in the week up to 6 April. As of 30 May, there had been 29 incidents of attempted arson at mobile-phone masts in the Netherlands, including one case where "Fuck 5G" was written. There have also been incidents in Ireland and Cyprus. Facebook has deleted messages encouraging attacks on 5G equipment.

A study authored by doctors Robert R. Brown and Beverly Rubik which concluded that a causal link between the virus and 5G was non-existent was misinterpreted on social media as evidence of a relation between the two.

Engineers working for Openreach, a division of British Telecom, posted pleas on anti-5G Facebook groups asking to be spared abuse as they are not involved with maintaining mobile networks. Industry lobby group Mobile UK said the incidents were affecting the maintenance of networks that support home working and provide critical connections to vulnerable customers, emergency services, and hospitals. A widely circulated video showed a woman accusing employees of broadband company Community Fibre of installing 5G as part of a plan to kill the population.

Of those who believed that 5G networks caused COVID-19 symptoms, 60% stated that much of their knowledge about the virus came from YouTube. In April 2020, YouTube announced that it would reduce the amount of content claiming links between 5G and COVID-19. Videos that are conspiratorial about 5G that do not mention COVID-19 would not be removed, though they might be considered "borderline content" and therefore removed from search recommendations, losing advertising revenue. The discredited claims had been circulated by British conspiracy theorist David Icke in videos (subsequently removed) on YouTube and Vimeo, and an interview by London Live TV network, prompting calls for action by Ofcom. It took YouTube on average 41 days to remove Covid-related videos containing false information in the first half of 2020.

Ofcom issued guidance to ITV following comments by Eamonn Holmes about 5G and COVID-19 on This Morning. Ofcom said the comments were "ambiguous" and "ill-judged" and they "risked undermining viewers' trust in advice from public authorities and scientific evidence". Ofcom also found local channel London Live in breach of standards for an interview it had with David Icke. It said that he had "expressed views which had the potential to cause significant harm to viewers in London during the pandemic".

In April 2020, The Guardian revealed that Jonathan Jones, an evangelical pastor from Luton, had provided the male voice on a recording blaming 5G for deaths caused by COVID-19. He claimed to have formerly headed the largest business unit at Vodafone, but insiders at the company said that he was hired for a sales position in 2014 when 5G was not a priority for the company and that 5G would not have been part of his job. He had left Vodafone after less than a year.

A tweet started an internet meme that Bank of England £20 banknotes contained a picture of a 5G mast and the SARS-CoV-2 virus. Facebook and YouTube removed items pushing this story, and fact checking organisations established that the picture is of Margate Lighthouse and the "virus" is the staircase at the Tate Britain.

=== American scientist selling virus to China ===
In April 2020, rumours circulated on Facebook, alleging that the US Government had "just discovered and arrested" Charles Lieber, chair of the Chemistry and Chemical Biology Department at Harvard University for "manufacturing and selling" the novel coronavirus (COVID-19) to China. According to a report from Reuters, posts spreading the rumour were shared in multiple languages over 79,000 times on Facebook. Lieber was arrested in January 2020, and later charged with two federal counts of making an allegedly false statement about his links to a Chinese university, unrelated to the virus. The rumour of Lieber, a chemist in an area entirely unrelated to the virus research, developing COVID-19 and selling it to China has been discredited.

=== Meteor origin ===
In 2020, a group of researchers that included Edward J. Steele and Chandra Wickramasinghe, the foremost living proponent of panspermia, speculated in ten research papers that COVID-19 originated from a meteor spotted as a bright fireball over the city of Songyuan in Northeast China in October 2019 and that a fragment of the meteor landed in the Wuhan area, which started the first COVID-19 outbreaks. However, the group of researchers did not provide any direct evidence proving this conjecture.

In an August 2020 article, Astronomy.com called the meteor origin conjecture "so remarkable that it makes the others look boring by comparison".

=== NCMI intelligence report ===
In April 2020, ABC News reported that, in November 2019, "U.S. intelligence officials were warning that a contagion was sweeping through China's Wuhan region, changing the patterns of life and business and posing a threat to the population". The article stated that the National Center for Medical Intelligence (NCMI), had produced an intelligence report in November 2019 which raised concerns about the situation. The director of the NCMI, Col. R. Shane Day said "media reporting about the existence/release of a National Center for Medical Intelligence Coronavirus-related product/assessment in November 2019 is not correct. No such NCMI product exists".

== PCR testing ==
Social media posts have falsely claimed that Kary Mullis, the inventor of polymerase chain reaction (PCR), said that PCR testing for SARS-CoV-2 does not work. Mullis, who received the Nobel Prize in Chemistry for the invention of PCR, died in August 2019 before the emergence of the SARS-CoV-2 virus and never made these statements. Several posts claim Mullis said "PCR tests cannot detect free infectious viruses at all", that PCR testing was designed to detect any non-human DNA or the DNA and RNA of the person being tested, or that the process of DNA amplification used in PCR will lead to contamination of the samples. A video of a 1997 interview with Mullis has also been widely circulated, in which Mullis says PCR will find "anything"; the video description asserts that this means PCR cannot be used to reliably detect SARS-CoV-2.

In reality, the reverse transcription polymerase chain reaction (RT-PCR) test for SARS-CoV-2 is highly sensitive to the virus, and testing laboratories have controls in place to prevent and detect contamination. However, the tests only reveal the presence of the virus and not whether it remains infectious.

A claim attributed to the Swiss Federal Office of Public Health that PCR testing is fraudulent became popular in the Philippines and remains a widespread belief. According to a report from AFP, research associate Joshua Miguel Danac of the University of the Philippines' National Institute of Molecular Biology and Biotechnology debunked the claim, calling PCR tests "the gold standard for diagnosis". Fake testing and perception of fake testing remains a problem in the Philippines.

== Symptoms and severity ==
In early 2020, there were a number of viral photos and videos that were mischaracterized as showing an extreme severity to COVID-19 exposure. In January and February 2020, a number of videos from China were circulated on social media that purported to show people infected with COVID-19 either suddenly collapsing, or having already collapsed, on the street. Some of these videos were republished or referenced by some tabloid newspapers, including the Daily Mail and The Sun. However, the people in these videos are generally believed to have been suffering from something other than COVID-19, such as one who was drunk.

A video from February 2020 purported to be of dead COVID-19 victims in China was actually a video from Shenzhen of people sleeping on the street. Similarly, a photo that circulated in March 2020 of dozens of people lying down in the street, purported to be of COVID-19 victims in either China or Italy, was in fact a photo of living people from a 2014 art project in Germany.

== Incidence and mortality ==
Correctly reporting the number of people who were sick or who had died was difficult, especially during the earliest days of the pandemic.

=== In China ===
==== Chinese under-reporting during early 2020 ====
Leaked documents show that China's public reporting of cases gave an incomplete picture during the early stages of the pandemic. For example, in February 2020, China publicly reported 2,478 new confirmed cases. However, confidential internal documents that later leaked to CNN showed 5,918 new cases in February. These were broken down as 2,345 confirmed cases, 1,772 clinically diagnosed cases and 1,796 suspected cases.

==== Nurse whistleblower ====
In January 2020, a video circulated online appearing to be of a nurse named Jin Hui in Hubei, describing a far more dire situation in Wuhan than reported by Chinese officials. However, the BBC said that, contrary to its English subtitles in one of the video's existing versions, the woman does not claim to be either a nurse or a doctor in the video and that her suit and mask do not match the ones worn by medical staff in Hubei.

The video claimed that more than 90,000 people had been infected with the virus in China, that the virus could spread from one person to 14 people (R_{0} = 14) and that the virus was starting a second mutation. The video attracted millions of views on various social media platforms and was mentioned in numerous online reports. The claimed R_{0} of 14 in the video was noted by the BBC to be inconsistent with the expert estimation of 1.4 to 2.5 at that time. The video's claim of 90,000 infected cases was noted to be 'unsubstantiated'.

==== Alleged leak of death toll by Tencent ====
In February 2020, Taiwan News published an article claiming that Tencent may have accidentally leaked the real numbers of death and infection in China. Taiwan News suggested that the Tencent Epidemic Situation Tracker had briefly showed infected cases and death tolls many times higher of the official figure, citing a Facebook post by a 38-year-old Taiwanese beverage store owner and an anonymous Taiwanese netizen. The article, referenced by other news outlets such as the Daily Mail and widely circulated on Twitter, Facebook and 4chan, sparked a wide range of conspiracy theories that the screenshot indicates the real death toll instead of the ones published by health officials.

The author of the original news article defended the authenticity and newsworthiness of the leak on a WION program.

==== Mass cremation in Wuhan ====
In February 2020, a report emerged on Twitter claiming that data showed a massive increase in sulfur emissions over Wuhan, China. The Twitter thread then claimed the reason was due to the mass cremation those who died from COVID-19. The story was shared on multiple media outlets, including Daily Express, Daily Mail, and Taiwan News. Snopes debunked the misinformation, pointing out that the maps used by the claims were not real-time observations of sulfur dioxide (SO_{2}) concentrations above Wuhan. Instead, the data was a computer-generated model based on historical information and forecast on SO_{2} emissions.

A story in The Epoch Times in February 2020 shared a map from the Internet that falsely alleged massive sulfur dioxide releases from crematoriums during the COVID-19 pandemic in China, speculating that 14,000 bodies may have been burned. A fact check by AFP reported that the map was a NASA forecast taken out of context.

==== Decline in cellphone subscriptions ====
There was a decrease of nearly 21 million cellphone subscriptions among the three largest cellphone carriers in China, which led to misinformation that this is evidence for millions of deaths due to COVID-19 in China. The drop is attributed to cancellations of phone services due to a downturn in the social and economic life during the outbreak.

=== In the US ===
Accusations have been made of under-reporting, over-reporting, and other problems. Necessary data was corrupted in some places, for example, on the state level in the United States.

The public health handling of the pandemic has been hampered by the use of archaic technology (including fax machines and incompatible formats), poor data flow and management (or even no access to data), and general lack of standardization and leadership. Privacy laws hampered contact tracing and case finding efforts, which resulted in under-diagnosis and under-reporting.

==== Allegations of inflated death counts ====
In August 2020, President Donald Trump retweeted a conspiracy theory alleging that COVID-19 deaths are systematically overcounted, and that only 6% of the reported deaths in the United States were actually from the disease. This 6% number is based on only counting death certificates where COVID-19 is the sole condition listed. The lead mortality statistician at the Centers for Disease Control and Prevention's (CDC) National Center for Health Statistics said that those death certificates likely did not include all the steps that led to the death and thus were incomplete. The CDC collects data based on case surveillance, vital records, and excess deaths. A FactCheck.org article on the issue reported that while 6% of the death certificates included COVID-19 exclusively as the cause of death and 94% had additional conditions that contributed to it, COVID-19 was listed as the underlying cause of death in 92% of them, as it may directly cause other severe conditions such as pneumonia or acute respiratory distress syndrome.

The U.S. experienced 882,000 "excess deaths" (i.e., deaths above the baseline expected from normal mortality in previous years) between February 2020 and January 2022, which is somewhat higher than the officially recorded mortality from COVID-19 during that period (835,000 deaths). Analysis of weekly data from each U.S. state shows that the calculated excess deaths are strongly correlated with COVID-19 infections, undercutting the notion that the deaths were primarily caused by some factor other than the disease.

==== Misleading Johns Hopkins News-Letter article ====
In November 2020, an article by Genevieve Briand (assistant director for the Master's program in Applied Economics at JHU) was published in the student-run Johns Hopkins News-Letter claiming to have found "no evidence that COVID-19 create[d] any excess deaths". The article was later retracted after it was used to promote conspiracy theories on right-wing social media accounts and misinformation websites, but the presentation was not removed from YouTube, where it had been viewed more than 58,000 times as of 3 December 2020.

Briand compared data from spring 2020 and January 2018, ignoring expected seasonal variations in mortality and unusual peaks in the spring and summer of 2020 compared to previous spring and summer months. Briand's article failed to account for the total excess mortality from all causes reported during the pandemic, with 300,000 deaths associated with the virus per CDC data in 2020. Deaths per age group were also shown as a proportion percentage rather than as raw numbers, obscuring the effects of the pandemic when the number of deaths increases but the proportions are maintained. The article also suggested that deaths attributed to cardiac and respiratory diseases in infected persons were incorrectly categorized as deaths due to COVID-19. This view fails to recognize that those with such conditions are more vulnerable to the virus and therefore more likely to die from it. The retraction of Briand's article went viral on social media under false claims of censorship.

=== Misinformation targeting Taiwan ===
In February 2020, the Taiwanese Central News Agency reported that large amounts of misinformation had appeared on Facebook claiming the pandemic in Taiwan was out of control, the Taiwanese government had covered up the total number of cases, and that President Tsai Ing-wen had been infected. The Taiwan fact-checking organization had suggested the misinformation on Facebook shared similarities with mainland China due to its use of simplified Chinese characters and mainland China vocabulary. The organization warned that the purpose of the misinformation is to attack the government.

In March 2020, Taiwan's Ministry of Justice Investigation Bureau warned that China was trying to undermine trust in factual news by portraying the Taiwanese government reports as fake news. Taiwanese authorities have been ordered to use all possible means to track whether the messages were linked to instructions given by the Chinese Communist Party. The PRC's Taiwan Affairs Office denied the claims, calling them lies, and said that Taiwan's Democratic Progressive Party was "inciting hatred" between the two sides. They then claimed that the "DPP continues to politically manipulate the virus".

Nick Monaco, the research director of the Digital Intelligence Lab at Institute for the Future, analysed the posts and concluded that the majority appear to have come from ordinary users in China, not the state. However, he criticized the Chinese government's decision to allow the information to spread beyond China's Great Firewall, which he described as "malicious". According to Taiwan News, nearly one in four cases of misinformation are believed to be connected to China.

=== Misrepresented World Population Project map ===
In early February 2020, a decade-old map illustrating a hypothetical viral outbreak published by the World Population Project (part of the University of Southampton) was misappropriated by a number of Australian media news outlets (and British tabloids The Sun, Daily Mail and Metro) which claimed the map represented the COVID-19 pandemic. This misinformation was then spread via the social media accounts of the same media outlets, and while some outlets later removed the map, the BBC reported, in February, that a number of news sites had yet to retract the map.

=== "Casedemic" ===
COVID-19 deniers use the word casedemic as a shorthand for a conspiracy theory holding that COVID-19 is harmless and that the reported disease figures are merely a result of increased testing. The concept is particularly attractive to anti-vaccination activists, who use it to argue that public health measures, and particularly vaccines, are not needed to counter what they say is a fake epidemic.

David Gorski writes that the word casedemic was seemingly coined by Ivor Cummins—an engineer whose views are popular among COVID-19 deniers—in August 2020.

The term has been adopted by alternative medicine advocate Joseph Mercola, who has exaggerated the effect of false positives in polymerase chain reaction (PCR) tests to construct a false narrative that testing is invalid because it is not perfectly accurate. In reality, the problems with PCR testing are well-known and accounted for by public health authorities. Such claims also disregard the possibility of asymptomatic spread, the number of potentially-undetected cases during the initial phases of the pandemic in comparison to the present due to increased testing and knowledge since, and other variables that can influence PCR tests.

== Disease spread ==
Early in the pandemic, little information was known about how the virus spreads, when the first people became sick, or who was most vulnerable to infection, serious complications, or death. During 2020, it became clear that the main route of spread was through exposure to the virus-laden respiratory droplets produced by an infected person. There were also some early questions about whether the disease might have been present earlier than reported; however, subsequent research disproved this idea.

=== California herd immunity in 2019 ===
In March 2020, Victor Davis Hanson publicized a theory that COVID-19 may have been in California in the fall of 2019 resulting in a level of herd immunity to at least partially explain differences in infection rates in cities such as New York City vs Los Angeles. Jeff Smith of Santa Clara County stated that evidence indicated the virus may have been in California since December 2019. Early genetic and antibody analyses refute the idea that the virus was in the United States prior to January 2020.

=== Patient Zero ===
In March 2020, conspiracy theorists started the false rumour that Maatje Benassi, a US army reservist, was "Patient Zero" of the pandemic, the first person to be infected with COVID-19. Benassi was targeted because of her participation in the 2019 Military World Games at Wuhan before the pandemic started, even though she never tested positive for the virus. Conspiracy theorists even connected her family to the DJ Benny Benassi as a Benassi virus plot, even though they are not related and Benny had also not had the virus.

=== Airborne ===
Before mid-2021 the World Health Organization (WHO) denied that COVID readily spread through the air; although, they acknowledged such spread could occur during certain medical procedures as of July 2020. In February 2020 the Director-General of WHO, Tedros Adhanom Ghebreyesus, initially stated COVID was airborne during a press conference, only to retract this statement a few minutes later. In March 2020 WHO tweeted "FACT: #COVID19 is NOT airborne."

The air quality researcher Lidia Morawska viewed their initial position as "spreading misinformation". Hundreds of scientists, by mid 2020, viewed airborne spread as occurring and called on the WHO to change their position. Concerns were raised that "conservative voices" within the WHO committee tasked with these guidelines were preventing new evidence from being incorporated.

=== Surfaces ===
Early in the pandemic it was claimed that COVID-19 could be spread by contact with contaminated surfaces or fomites—even though this is an uncommon transmission route for other respiratory viruses. This led to recommendations that high-contact surfaces (like playground equipment or school desks) be frequently deep-cleaned and that certain items (like groceries or mailed packages) be disinfected. Ultimately, the US Centers for Disease Control and Prevention (CDC) concluded that the likelihood of transmission under these scenarios was less than 1 in 10,000. They further concluded that handwashing reduced the risk of exposure to COVID-19, but surface disinfection did not.

=== Susceptibility based on ethnicity ===
There have been claims that specific ethnicities are more or less vulnerable to COVID-19. COVID-19 is a new zoonotic disease, so no population has yet had the time to develop population immunity.

Beginning in February 2020, reports quickly spread via Facebook, implied that a Cameroonian student in China had been completely cured of the virus due to his African genetics. While a student was successfully treated, other media sources have indicated that no evidence implies Africans are more resistant to the virus and labelled such claims as false information. Kenyan Secretary of Health Mutahi Kagwe explicitly refuted rumours that "those with black skin cannot get coronavirus [disease 2019]", while announcing Kenya's first case in March. This false claim was cited as a contributing factor in the disproportionately high rates of infection and death observed among African Americans.

There have been claims of "Indian immunity": that the people of India have more immunity to the COVID-19 virus due to living conditions in India. This idea was deemed "absolute drivel" by Anand Krishnan, professor at the Centre for Community Medicine of the All India Institute of Medical Sciences (AIIMS). He said there was no population immunity to the COVID-19 virus yet, as it is new, and it is not even clear whether people who have recovered from COVID-19 will have lasting immunity, as this happens with some viruses but not with others.

Iran's Supreme Leader Ayatollah Ali Khamenei claimed the virus was genetically targeted at Iranians by the US, giving this explanation for the pandemic having seriously affected Iran. He did not offer any evidence.

A group of Jordanian researchers published a report claiming that Arabs are less vulnerable to COVID-19 due to a genetic variation specific to those of Middle East heritage. This paper had not been debunked by November 2020.

==== Xenophobic blaming by ethnicity and religion ====
UN video warns that misinformation against groups may lower testing rates and increase transmission.

COVID-19-related xenophobic attacks have been made against individuals with the attacker blaming the victim for COVID-19 on the basis of the victim's ethnicity. People who are considered to look Chinese have been subjected to COVID-19-related verbal and physical attacks in many other countries, often by people accusing them of transmitting the virus. Within China, there has been discrimination (such as evictions and refusal of service in shops) against people from anywhere closer to Wuhan (where the pandemic started) and against anyone perceived as being non-Chinese (especially those considered African), as the Chinese government has blamed continuing cases on re-introductions of the virus from abroad (90% of reintroduced cases were by Chinese passport-holders). Neighbouring countries have also discriminated against people seen as Westerners.

People have also simply blamed other local groups along the lines of pre-existing social tensions and divisions, sometimes citing reporting of COVID-19 cases within that group. For instance, Muslims have been widely blamed, shunned, and discriminated against in India (including some violent attacks), amid unfounded claims that Muslims are deliberately spreading COVID-19, and a Muslim event at which the disease did spread has received far more public attention than many similar events run by other groups and the government. White supremacist groups have blamed COVID-19 on non-whites and advocated deliberately infecting minorities they dislike, such as Jews.

=== Bat soup ===
Some media outlets, including Daily Mail and RT, as well as individuals, disseminated a video showing a Chinese woman eating a bat, falsely suggesting it was filmed in Wuhan and connecting it to the outbreak. However, the widely circulated video contains unrelated footage of a Chinese travel vlogger, Wang Mengyun, eating bat soup in the island country of Palau in 2016. Wang posted an apology on Weibo, in which she said she had been abused and threatened, and that she had only wanted to showcase Palauan cuisine. The spread of misinformation about bat consumption has been characterized by xenophobic and racist sentiment toward Asians. In contrast, scientists suggest the virus originated in bats and migrated into an intermediary host animal before infecting people.

=== Large gatherings ===
South Korean "conservative populist" Jun Kwang-hun told his followers there was no risk to mass public gatherings as the virus was impossible to contract outdoors. Many of his followers are elderly.

=== Lifetime of the virus ===
Misinformation has spread that the lifetime of SARS-CoV-2 is only 12 hours and that staying home for 14 hours during the Janata curfew would break the chain of transmission. Another message claimed that observing the Janata curfew would result in the reduction of COVID-19 cases by 40%.

=== Mosquitoes ===
It has been claimed that mosquitoes transmit COVID-19. There is no evidence that this is true.

=== Contaminated objects ===
A fake Costco product recall notice circulated on social media purporting that Kirkland-brand bath tissue had been contaminated with COVID-19 (meaning SARS-CoV-2) due to the item being made in China. No evidence supports that SARS-CoV-2 can survive on surfaces for prolonged periods of time (as might happen during shipping), and Costco has not issued such a recall.

A warning claiming to be from the Australia Department of Health said COVID-19 spreads through petrol pumps and that everyone should wear gloves when filling up petrol in their cars.

There were claims that wearing shoes in one's home was the reason behind the spread of COVID-19 in Italy.

=== Cruise ships as safe havens ===
Claims by cruise-ship operators notwithstanding, there are many cases of coronaviruses in hot climates; some countries in the Caribbean, the Mediterranean, and the Persian Gulf are severely affected.

In March 2020, the Miami New Times reported that managers at Norwegian Cruise Line had prepared a set of responses intended to convince wary customers to book cruises, including "blatantly false" claims that COVID-19 "can only survive in cold temperatures, so the Caribbean is a fantastic choice for your next cruise", that "Scientists and medical professionals have confirmed that the warm weather of the spring will be the end of the Coronavirus [sic]", and that the virus "cannot live in the amazingly warm and tropical temperatures that your cruise will be sailing to".

Flu is seasonal (becoming less frequent in the summer) in some countries, but not in others. While it is possible that COVID-19 will also show some seasonality, this has not yet been determined. When COVID-19 spread along international air travel routes, it did not bypass tropical locations. Outbreaks on cruise ships, where an older population lives in close quarters, frequently touching surfaces which others have touched, were common.

It seems that COVID-19 can be transmitted in all climates. It has seriously affected many warm-climate countries. For instance, Dubai, with a year-round average daily high of 28.0 Celsius (82.3 °F) and the airport said to have the world's most international traffic, has had thousands of cases.

=== Breastfeeding ===
While commercial companies that make breastmilk substitutes promote their products during the pandemic, the WHO and UNICEF advise that women should continue to breastfeed during the COVID-19 pandemic even if they have confirmed or suspected COVID-19. Evidence as of May 2020 indicates that it is unlikely that COVID-19 can be transmitted through breast milk.

=== Sexual transmission and infertility ===
COVID-19 can persist in men's semen even after they have begun to recover, although the virus cannot replicate in the reproductive system.

Chinese researchers who found the virus in the semen of men infected with COVID-19, claimed that this opened up a small chance the disease could be sexually transmitted, though this claim has been questioned by other academics since this has been shown with many other viruses such as Ebola and Zika.

A team of Italian scholars found that 11 of 43 men who recovered from infections, or one-quarter of the test subjects, had either azoospermia (no sperm in semen) or oligospermia (low sperm count). Mechanisms through which infectious diseases affect sperm is roughly divided into two categories. One involves viruses entering the testes, where they attack spermatogonia. The other involves high fever exposing the testes to heat and thereby killing sperm.

== Prevention ==
People tried many different things to prevent infection. Sometimes the misinformation was false claims of efficacy, such as claims that the virus could not spread during religious ceremonies, and at other times the misinformation was false claims of inefficacy, such as claiming that alcohol-based hand sanitizer did not work. In other cases, especially with regard to public health advice about wearing face masks, additional scientific evidence resulted in different advice over time.

=== Hand sanitizer, antibacterial soaps ===
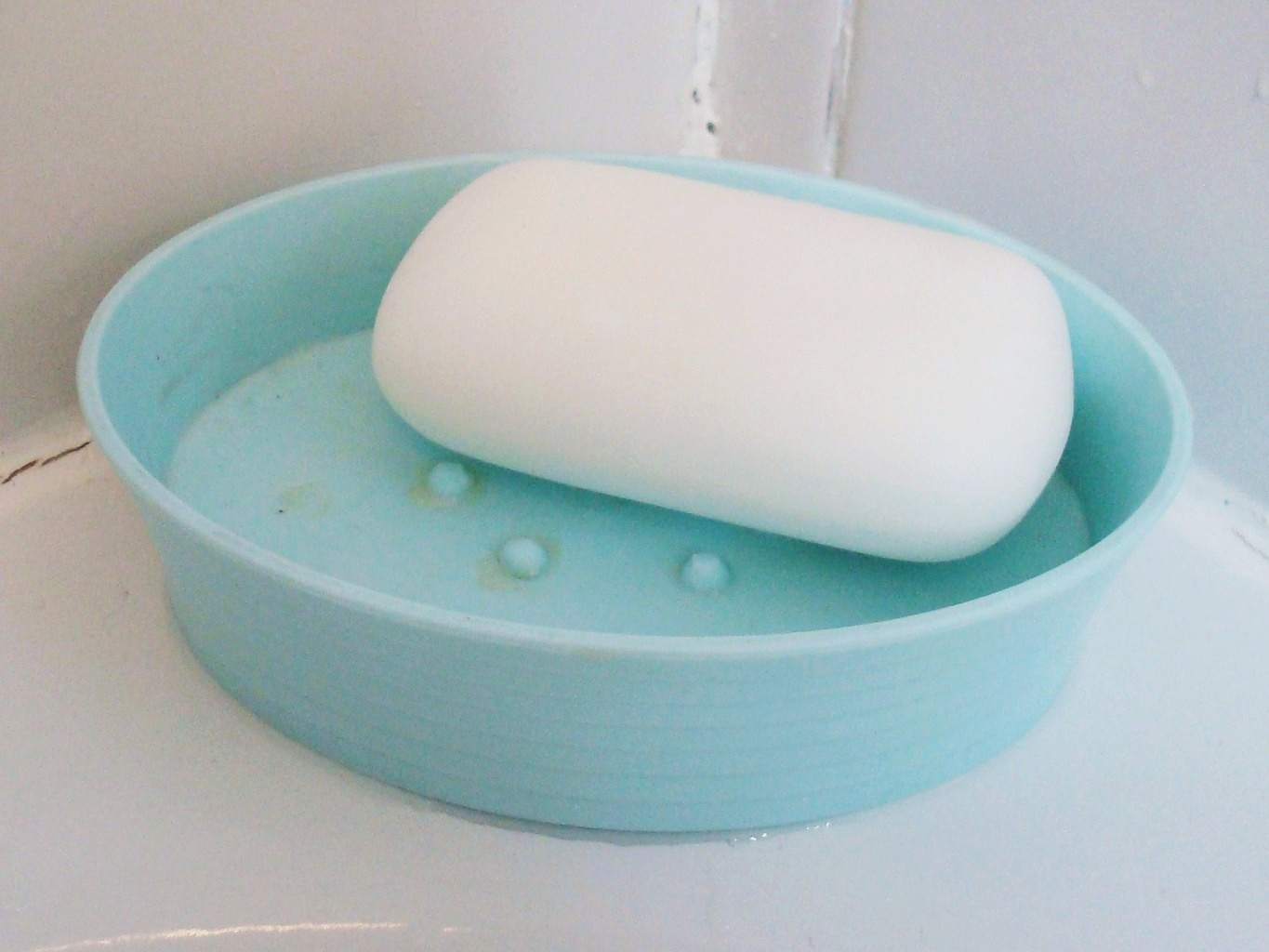
Washing in soap and water for at least 20 seconds is the best way to clean hands. The second-best is a hand sanitizer that is at least 60% alcohol.

Claims that hand sanitizer is merely "antibacterial not antiviral", and therefore ineffective against COVID-19, have spread widely on Twitter and other social networks. While the effectiveness of sanitiser depends on the specific ingredients, most hand sanitiser sold commercially inactivates SARS-CoV-2, which causes COVID-19. Hand sanitizer is recommended against COVID-19, though unlike soap, it is not effective against all types of germs. Washing in soap and water for at least 20 seconds is recommended by the US Centers for Disease Control and Prevention (CDC) as the best way to clean hands in most situations. However, if soap and water are not available, a hand sanitizer that is at least 60% alcohol can be used instead, unless hands are visibly dirty or greasy. The CDC and the Food and Drug Administration both recommend plain soap; there is no evidence that antibacterial soaps are any better, and limited evidence that they might be worse long-term.

=== Public use of face masks ===
Authorities, especially in Asia, recommended wearing face masks in public early in the pandemic. In other parts of the world, authorities made conflicting (or contradictory) statements. Several governments and institutions, such as in the United States, initially dismissed the use of face masks by the general population, often with misleading or incomplete information about their effectiveness. Commentators have attributed the anti-mask messaging to attempts at managing mask shortages caused by initial inaction, remarking that the claims went beyond the science, or were simply lies.

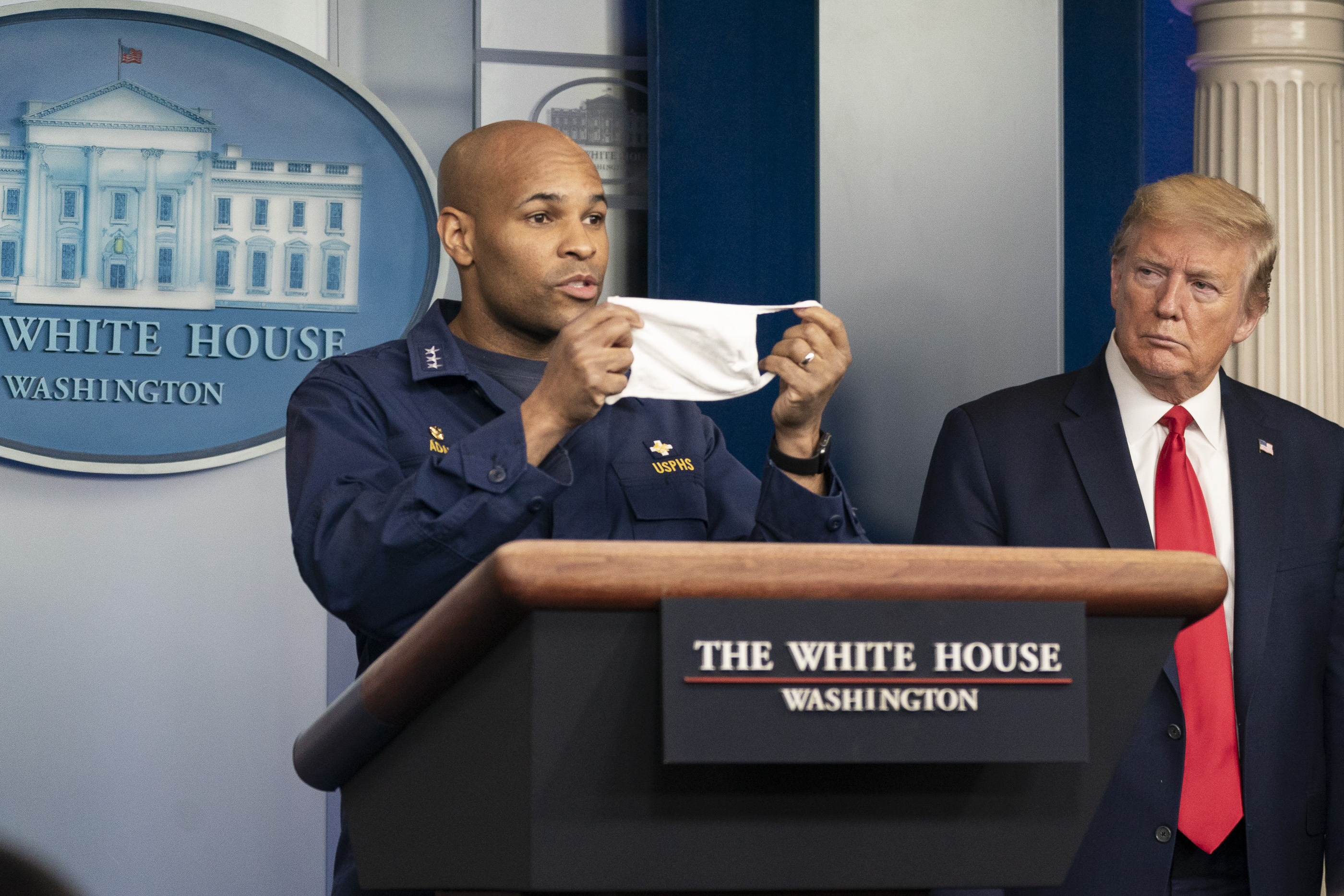
The U.S. Surgeon General Jerome Adams urged people to wear face masks and acknowledged that it is difficult to correct earlier messaging that masks do not work for the general public.

In February 2020, U.S. Surgeon General Jerome Adams tweeted "Seriously people—STOP BUYING MASKS! They are NOT effective in preventing general public from catching #Coronavirus [disease 2019]"; he later reversed his position with increasing evidence that masks can limit the spread of COVID-19. In June 2020, Anthony Fauci (a key member of the White House Coronavirus Task Force) confirmed that the American public were told not to wear masks from the beginning, due to a shortage of masks, and then explained that masks do actually work.

Some media outlets claimed that neck gaiters were worse than not wearing masks at all in the COVID-19 pandemic, misinterpreting a study which was intended to demonstrate a method for evaluating masks (and not actually to determine the effectiveness of different types of masks). The study also only looked at one wearer wearing the one neck gaiter made from a polyester/spandex blend, which is not sufficient evidence to support the claim about gaiters made in the media. The study found that the neck gaiter, which was made from a thin and stretchy material, appeared to be ineffective at limiting airborne droplets expelled from the wearer; Isaac Henrion, one of the co-authors, suggests that the result was likely due to the material rather than the style, stating that "Any mask made from that fabric would probably have the same result, no matter the design." Warren S. Warren, a co-author, said that they tried to be careful with their language in interviews, but added that the press coverage has "careened out of control" for a study testing a measuring technique.

There are false claims spread that the usage of masks causes adverse health-related issues such as low blood oxygen levels, high blood carbon dioxide levels, and a weakened immune system. Some also falsely claimed that masks cause antibiotic-resistant pneumonia by preventing pathogenic organisms to be exhaled away from the body.

Individuals have speciously claimed legal or medical exemptions to avoid complying with mask mandates. Individuals have, for instance, claimed that the Americans with Disabilities Act (ADA; designed to prohibit discrimination based on disabilities) allows exemption from mask requirements. The United States Department of Justice (DOJ) responded that the Act "does not provide a blanket exemption to people with disabilities from complying with legitimate safety requirements necessary for safe operations". The DOJ also issued a warning about cards (sometimes featuring DOJ logos or ADA notices) that claim to "exempt" their holders from wearing masks, stating that these cards are fraudulent and not issued by any government agency.

=== Alcohol, tobacco, and other drugs ===
Contrary to some reports, drinking alcohol does not protect against COVID-19, and can increase short term and long term health risks. Drinking alcohol is made with pure ethanol. Other substances such as hand sanitizer, wood alcohol, and denatured alcohol contain other alcohols, such as isopropanol or methanol. These other alcohols are poisonous, and may cause gastric ulcers, blindness, liver failure, or death. Such chemicals are commonly present in improperly fermented or distilled alcoholic beverages.

Several countries, including Iran and Turkey have reported incidents of methanol poisoning, caused by the false belief that drinking alcohol would cure or protect against COVID-19. Alcohol is banned in Iran, and bootleg alcohol may contain methanol. According to the Associated Press in March 2020, 480 people had died and 2,850 become ill due to methanol poisoning. That figure reached 700 by April.

In Kenya, in April 2020, the Governor of Nairobi Mike Sonko came under scrutiny for including small bottles of the cognac Hennessy in care packages, falsely claiming that alcohol serves as "throat sanitizer".

In 2020, tobacco smoking spread on social media as a false remedy to COVID-19 after a few small observational studies were published in which tobacco smoking was shown to be preventative against SARS-CoV-2. In April 2020, researchers at a Paris hospital noted an inverse relationship between smoking and COVID-19 infections, which led to an increase in tobacco sales in France. These results were at first so astonishing that the French government initiated a clinical trial with transdermal nicotine patches. More recent clinical evidence based on larger studies clearly demonstrates that smokers have an increased chance of COVID-19 infection and experience more severe respiratory symptoms.

In early 2020, several viral tweets spread around Europe and Africa, suggesting that snorting cocaine would sterilize one's nostrils of SARS-CoV-2. In response, the French Ministry of Health released a public service announcement debunking this claim, saying "No, cocaine does NOT protect against COVID-19. It is an addictive drug that causes serious side effects and is harmful to people's health." The World Health Organization also debunked the claim.

=== Warm or hot drinks ===
There were several claims that drinking warm drinks at a temperature of around 30 °C (86 °F) protects one from COVID-19, most notably by Alberto Fernández, the president of Argentina said "The WHO recommends that one drink many hot drinks because heat kills the virus." Scientists commented that the WHO had made no such recommendation, and that drinking hot water can damage the oral mucosa.

=== Religious protection ===
A number of religious groups have claimed protection due to their faith. Some refused to stop practices, such as gatherings of large groups, that promoted the transmission of the virus.

In Israel, some Ultra-Orthodox Jews initially refused to close synagogues and religious seminaries and disregarded government restrictions because "The Torah protects and saves", which resulted in an eight-fold faster rate of infection among some groups.

In South Korea the River of Grace Community Church in Gyeonggi Province spread the virus after spraying salt water into their members' mouths in the belief that it would kill the virus, while the Shincheonji Church of Jesus in Daegu where a church leader claimed that no Shincheonji worshippers had caught the virus in February while hundreds died in Wuhan, later caused the biggest spread of the virus in the country. In Tanzania, President John Magufuli, instead of banning congregations, urged the faithfuls to go to pray in churches and mosques in the belief that it will protect them. He said that COVID-19 is a devil, therefore "cannot survive in the body of Jesus Christ; it will burn" (the "body of Jesus Christ" refers to the Christian church).

Despite the COVID-19 pandemic, in March 2020, the Church of Greece announced that Holy Communion, in which churchgoers eat pieces of bread soaked in wine from the same chalice, would continue as a practice. The Holy Synod said Holy Communion "cannot be the cause of the spread of illness", with Metropolitan Seraphim saying the wine was without blemish because it represented the blood and body of Christ, and that "whoever attends Holy Communion is approaching God, who has the power to heal". The Church refused to restrict Christians from taking Holy Communion, which was supported by several clerics, some politicians, and health professionals. The Greek Association of Hospital Doctors criticized these professionals for putting their religious beliefs before science. A review of the medical publications on the subject, published by a Greek physician, claims that the transmission of any infectious disease through the Holy Communion has never been documented. This controversy divided the Greek society, the politics and medical experts.

The Islamic missionary movement Tablighi Jamaat organised Ijtema mass gatherings in Malaysia, India, and Pakistan whose participants believed that God will protect them, causing the biggest rise in COVID-19 cases in these and other countries. In Iran, the head of Fatima Masumeh Shrine encouraged pilgrims to visit the shrine despite calls to close the shrine, saying that they "consider this holy shrine to be a place of healing". In Somalia, false claims have spread Muslims are immune to the virus.

=== Helicopter spraying ===
In Sri Lanka, the Philippines and India, it has been claimed that one should stay at home on particular days when helicopters spray "COVID-19 disinfectant" over homes. No such spraying has taken place, nor is it planned, nor, as of July 2020, is there any such agent that could be sprayed.

=== Food ===
In India, fake news circulated that the World Health Organization warned against eating cabbage to prevent COVID-19 infection. Claims that the poisonous fruit of the Datura plant is a preventive measure for COVID-19 resulted in eleven people being hospitalized in India. They ate the fruit, following the instructions from a TikTok video that propagated misinformation regarding the prevention of COVID-19.

Claims that vegetarians are immune to COVID-19 spread online in India, causing "#NoMeat_NoCoronaVirus" to trend on Twitter. Such claims are false.

=== Vitamin D ===
In February 2020, claims that Vitamin D pills could help prevent COVID-19 circulated on social media in Thailand. Some conspiracy theorists have claimed that vitamin D was being intentionally suppressed as a preventative option by governments.

One meta-analysis found weak evidence that increased vitamin D levels may reduce the likelihood of intensive care admission for people with COVID-19; but found no effect of mortality.

A preprint of a journal article from Indonesia purporting to show a beneficial effect of vitamin D for COVID-19 went viral across social media, and was cited several times in mainstream academic literature, including in a recommendation from NICE. Tabloid newspapers such as the Daily Mail and The Sun likewise promoted the story. Subsequent investigation, however, found none of the authors seemed to be known of at the hospitals listed as their affiliations, suggesting the paper was entirely fraudulent.

A study of YouTube content concerning vitamin D and COVID-19 in 2020 found that over three quarters of the 77 videos analysed as part of the study contained false and misleading information. Most alarmingly according to the study's authors, the majority of the purveyors of misinformation in these videos were medical professionals. The study concluded that much of the advice given by these YouTube videos may result in adverse health outcomes such as increase in risk of skin cancer from excessive sunlight exposure, if viewers followed it.

== Vaccines ==
A variety of unfounded conspiracy theories and other misinformation about COVID-19 vaccines have spread based on misunderstood or misrepresented science, religion, and law. These have included exaggerated claims about side effects, misrepresentations about how the immune system works and when and how COVID-19 vaccines are made, a story about COVID-19 being spread by 5G, and other false or distorted information. This misinformation, some created by anti-vaccination activists, has proliferated and may have made many people averse to vaccination.

Vaccine hesitancy has led to governments and private organizations around the world introducing measures to incentivize or coerce vaccination, such as lotteries, mandates, and free entry to events, which has in turn led to further misinformation about the legality and effect of these measures themselves. Critics of vaccine mandates have argued that such requirements infringe on individual medical choice and personal autonomy.

In the US, some prominent biomedical scientists who publicly advocate vaccination have been attacked and threatened in emails and on social media by anti-vaccination activists.

== Hospital conditions ==
Some conservative figures in the United States, such as Richard Epstein, downplayed the scale of the pandemic, saying it has been exaggerated as part of an effort to hurt President Trump. Some people pointed to empty hospital parking lots as evidence that the virus has been exaggerated. Despite the empty parking lots, many hospitals in New York City and other places experienced thousands of COVID-19-related hospitalizations.

In the course of 2020, conspiracy theorists used the #FilmYourHospital hashtag to encourage people to record videos in seemingly empty, or sparsely populated hospitals, in order to prove that the pandemic was a "hoax".

== Treatment ==
Widely circulated posts on social media have made many unfounded claims of treatment methods of COVID-19. Some of these claims are scams, and some promoted methods are dangerous and unhealthy.

=== Herbal treatments ===
Various national and party-held Chinese media heavily advertised an "overnight research" report by Wuhan Institute of Virology and Shanghai Institute of Materia Medica, Chinese Academy of Sciences, on how shuanghuanglian, an herb mixture from traditional Chinese medicine (TCM), can effectively inhibit COVID-19. The report led to a purchase craze of shuanghuanglian.

The president of Madagascar Andry Rajoelina launched and promoted in April 2020 a herbal drink based on an artemisia plant as a miracle cure that can treat and prevent COVID-19 despite a lack of medical evidence. The drink has been exported to other African countries.

Based on in-vitro studies, extracts of E. purpurea (Echinaforce) showed virucidal activity against coronaviruses, including SARS-CoV-2. Because the data was experimental and solely derived from cell cultures, antiviral effects in humans have not been elucidated. As a result, regulatory agencies have not recommended the use of Echinacea preparations for the prophylaxis and treatment of COVID-19.

=== Vitamin C ===
During the early years of the COVID-19 pandemic, vitamin C was the subject of more FDA warning letters than any other quack treatment for COVID-19. In April 2021, the US National Institutes of Health (NIH) COVID-19 Treatment Guidelines stated that "there are insufficient data to recommend either for or against the use of vitamin C for the prevention or treatment of COVID-19." In an update posted December 2022, the NIH position was unchanged:

- There is insufficient evidence for the COVID-19 Treatment Guidelines Panel (the Panel) to recommend either for or against the use of vitamin C for the treatment of COVID-19 in nonhospitalized patients.
- There is insufficient evidence for the Panel to recommend either for or against the use of vitamin C for the treatment of COVID-19 in hospitalized patients.

=== Common cold and flu treatments ===
In March 2020, a photo circulated online showing a 30-year-old Indian textbook that lists aspirin, antihistamines, and nasal spray as treatments for coronavirus diseases. False claims spread asserting that the book was evidence that COVID-19 started much earlier than reported and that common cold treatments could be a cure for COVID-19. The textbook actually talks about coronaviruses in general, as a family of viruses.

A rumour circulated on social media posts on Weibo, Facebook and Twitter claiming that Chinese experts said saline solutions could kill COVID-19. There is no evidence for this.

A tweet from French health minister Olivier Véran, a bulletin from the French health ministry, and a small speculative study in The Lancet Respiratory Medicine raised concerns about ibuprofen worsening COVID-19, which spread extensively on social media. The European Medicines Agency and the World Health Organization recommended COVID-19 patients keep taking ibuprofen as directed, citing lack of convincing evidence of any danger.

=== Cow dung and urine ===
Indian political activist Swami Chakrapani and Member of the Legislative Assembly Suman Haripriya claimed that drinking cow urine and applying cow dung on the body can cure COVID-19. In Manipur, two people were arrested under the National Security Act for social media posts which said cow urine and dung did not cure the virus. (They were arrested under Section 153 of the Indian Penal Code for allegedly promoting enmity between different groups on grounds of religion, race, place of birth, residence, language, etc. and acts prejudicial to maintenance of harmony).

WHO's chief scientist Soumya Swaminathan criticised politicians incautiously spreading such misinformation without evidence.

=== 2-Deoxy-D-glucose ===
A drug based on 2-deoxy-D-glucose (2-DG) was approved by the Drugs Controller General of India for emergency use as adjunct therapy in moderate to severe COVID-19 patients.

The drug was launched at a press conference with a false claim that it was approved by the World Health Organization. It was developed by the DRDO along with Dr. Reddy's Laboratories, who stated in a press release, that the drug "helps in faster recovery of hospitalised patients and reduces supplemental oxygen dependence". The Wire as well as The Hindu noted that the approval was based on poor evidence; no journal publication (or preprint) concerning efficacy and safety are yet available.

=== Traditional Chinese Medicine (TCM) prescriptions ===
Since its third version, the COVID management guidelines from the Chinese National Health Commission recommends using Traditional Chinese medicines to treat the disease. In Wuhan, China Central Television reported that local authorities have pushed for a set of TCM prescriptions to be used for every case since early February. One formula was promoted at the national level by mid-February. The local field hospitals were explicitly TCM-oriented. According to state media, as of 16 March 2020, 91.91% of all Hubei patients have used TCM, with the rate reaching 99% in field hospitals and 94% in bulk quarantine areas. In March 2020, the online insert of the official People's Daily, distributed in The Daily Telegraph, published an article stating that Traditional Chinese medicine "helps fight coronavirus [disease 2019]".

=== Chloroquine and hydroxychloroquine ===
There were claims that chloroquine was used to cure more than 12,000 COVID-19 patients in Nigeria.

In March 2020, Adrian Bye, a tech startup leader who is not a doctor, suggested to cryptocurrency investors Gregory Rigano and James Todaro that "chloroquine will keep most people out of hospital". (Bye later admitted that he had reached this conclusion through "philosophy" rather than medical research.) Two days later, Rigano and Todaro promoted chloroquine in a self-published article that claimed affiliation with the Stanford University School of Medicine, the National Academy of Sciences and the Birmingham School of Medicine – the three institutions mentioned that they had no links to the article, and Google removed the article for violating its terms of service.

=== Ivermectin ===
Ivermectin is an antiparasitic drug that is well established for use in animals and people. The World Health Organization (WHO), the European Medicines Agency (EMA), the United States Food and Drug Administration (FDA), and the Infectious Diseases Society of America (IDSA) all do not advise using ivermectin in an attempt to treat or prevent COVID-19.

Early in the COVID-19 pandemic, laboratory research suggested ivermectin might have a role in preventing or treating COVID-19. Online misinformation campaigns and advocacy boosted the drug's profile among the public. While scientists and physicians largely remained skeptical, some nations adopted ivermectin as part of their pandemic-control efforts. Some people, desperate to use ivermectin without a prescription, took veterinary preparations, which led to shortages of supplies of ivermectin for animal treatment. The FDA responded to this situation by saying "You are not a horse. You are not a cow. Seriously, y'all. Stop it", in a tweet to draw attention to the issue, for which they were later sued by three ivermectin-prescribing doctors.

Subsequent research failed to confirm the utility of ivermectin for COVID-19, and in 2021 it emerged that many of the studies demonstrating benefit were faulty, misleading, or fraudulent. Nevertheless, misinformation about ivermectin continued to be propagated on social media and the drug remained a cause célèbre for anti-vaccinationists and conspiracy theorists. This spread to conspiracy theorists further asserting that ivermectin could treat all diseases.

=== Dangerous treatments ===
Proponents of Miracle Mineral Supplement (an aqueous solution of chlorine dioxide that is generally considered ineffective and dangerous for treating disease) have also promoted it as a treatment for COVID-19. On 8 July 2020, the Food and Drug Administration in the US raided the family compound of Mark Grenon, founder of Genesis II Church of Health and Healing, a promoter and distributor of MMS. In October 2023, Mark, alongside many of his family members, were sentenced to prison for distributing an unapproved and misbranded drug.

Twelve people were hospitalized in India when they ingested the poisonous thornapple (Datura stramonium AKA Jimsonweed) after seeing the plant recommended as a 'coronavirus [disease 2019] home remedy' in a TikTok video. Datura species contain many substances poisonous to humans, mainly through anticholinergic effects.

=== Silver ===
In February 2020, televangelist Jim Bakker promoted a colloidal silver solution, sold on his website, as a remedy for COVID-19; naturopath Sherrill Sellman, a guest on his show, falsely stated that it "hasn't been tested on this strain of the coronavirus, but it's been tested on other strains of the coronavirus and has been able to eliminate it within 12 hours". The US Food and Drug Administration and New York Attorney General's office both issued cease-and-desist orders against Bakker, and he was sued by the state of Missouri over the sales.

The New York Attorney General's office also issued a cease-and-desist order to radio host Alex Jones, who was selling silver-infused toothpaste that he falsely claimed could kill the virus and had been verified by federal officials, causing a Jones spokesman to deny the products had been sold for the purpose of treating any disease. The FDA later threatened Jones with legal action and seizure of several silver-based products if he continued to promote their use against COVID-19.

=== Mustard oil ===
The yoga guru Ramdev claimed that one can treat COVID-19 by pouring mustard oil through the nose, causing the virus to flow into the stomach where it would be destroyed by gastric acid. He also claimed that if a person can hold their breath for a minute, it means they do not have any type of coronavirus, symptomatic or asymptomatic. Both these claims were found to be false.

=== Untested treatments ===
U.S. president Donald Trump suggested at a press briefing in April 2020 that disinfectant injections or exposure to ultraviolet light might help treat COVID-19. There is no evidence that either could be a viable method.

Misinformation that the Indian government was spreading an "anti-corona" drug in the country during Janata curfew, a stay-at-home curfew enforced in India, went viral on social media.

Following the first reported case of COVID-19 in Nigeria in February, untested cures and treatments began to spread via platforms such as WhatsApp.

In March 2020, the US Federal Bureau of Investigation arrested actor Keith Lawrence Middlebrook for wire fraud with a fake COVID-19 cure.

=== Spiritual healing ===
The American televangelist, Kenneth Copeland, claimed on Victory Channel during a programme called "Standing Against Coronavirus", that he can cure television viewers of COVID-19 directly from the television studio. The viewers had to touch the television screen to receive the spiritual healing.

Vision Times, a media outlet affiliated with Falun Gong, promoted claims that people were recovering from COVID-19 after participating in a Falun Gong ritual involving the recitation of "nine sacred words". Dr David Brophy of the University of Sydney noted that Vision Times presented the account as a serious factual report.

=== Organ trafficking ===
In India, baseless rumours spread saying that people were being taken to care centres and killed to harvest their organs, with their bodies then being swapped to avoid suspicion. These rumours spread more quickly through online platforms such as WhatsApp, and resulted in protests, attacks against healthcare workers, and reduced willingness to seek COVID-19 testing and treatment.

== Other ==
=== Name of the disease ===
Social media posts and Internet memes claimed that COVID-19 derives from "Chinese Originated Viral Infectious Disease 19", or similar, as supposedly the "19th virus to come out of China". In fact, the WHO named the disease as follows: CO stands for corona, VI for virus, D for disease and 19 for when the outbreak was first identified (31 December 2019).

Another false social media rumour claimed COVID-19 was an acronym derived from a series of ancient symbols interpreted as "see a sheep surrender."

=== Simpsons prediction ===
Claims that The Simpsons had predicted the COVID-19 pandemic in 1993, accompanied by a doctored screenshot from the episode "The Fool Monty" (where the text "Corona Virus" was layered over the original text "Apocalypse Meow", without blocking it from view), were later found to be false. The claim had been widely spread on social media.

=== Return of wildlife ===
During the pandemic, many false and misleading images or news reports about the environmental impact of the COVID-19 pandemic were shared by clickbait journalism sources and social media.

A viral post that originated on Weibo and spread on Twitter claimed that a pack of elephants descended on a village under quarantine in China's Yunnan, got drunk on corn wine, and passed out in a tea garden. A Chinese news report debunked the claim that the elephants got drunk on corn wine and noted that wild elephants were a common sight in the village; the image attached to the post was originally taken at the Asian Elephant Research Center in Yunnan in December 2019.

Following reports of reduced pollution levels in Italy as a result of lockdowns, images purporting to show swans and dolphins swimming in Venice canals went viral on social media. The image of the swans was revealed to have been taken in Burano, where swans are common, while footage of the dolphins was filmed at a port in Sardinia hundreds of miles away. The Venice mayor's office clarified that the reported water clarity in the canals was due to the lack of sediment being kicked up by boat traffic, not a reduction in water pollution as initially reported.

Following the lockdown of India, a video clip purporting to show the extremely rare Malabar civet (a critically endangered, possibly extinct, species) walking the empty streets of Meppayur went viral on social media. Experts later identified the civet in the video as actually being the much commoner small Indian civet. Another viral Indian video clip showed a pod of humpback whales allegedly returning to the Arabian Sea offshore from Mumbai following the shutdown of shipping routes; however, this video was found to have actually been taken in 2019 in the Java Sea.

=== Virus remains in body permanently ===
It has been wrongly claimed that anyone infected with COVID-19 will have the virus in their bodies for life. While there is no curative treatment, most infected people recover from the disease and eliminate the virus from their bodies.

=== COVID-19 denialism ===
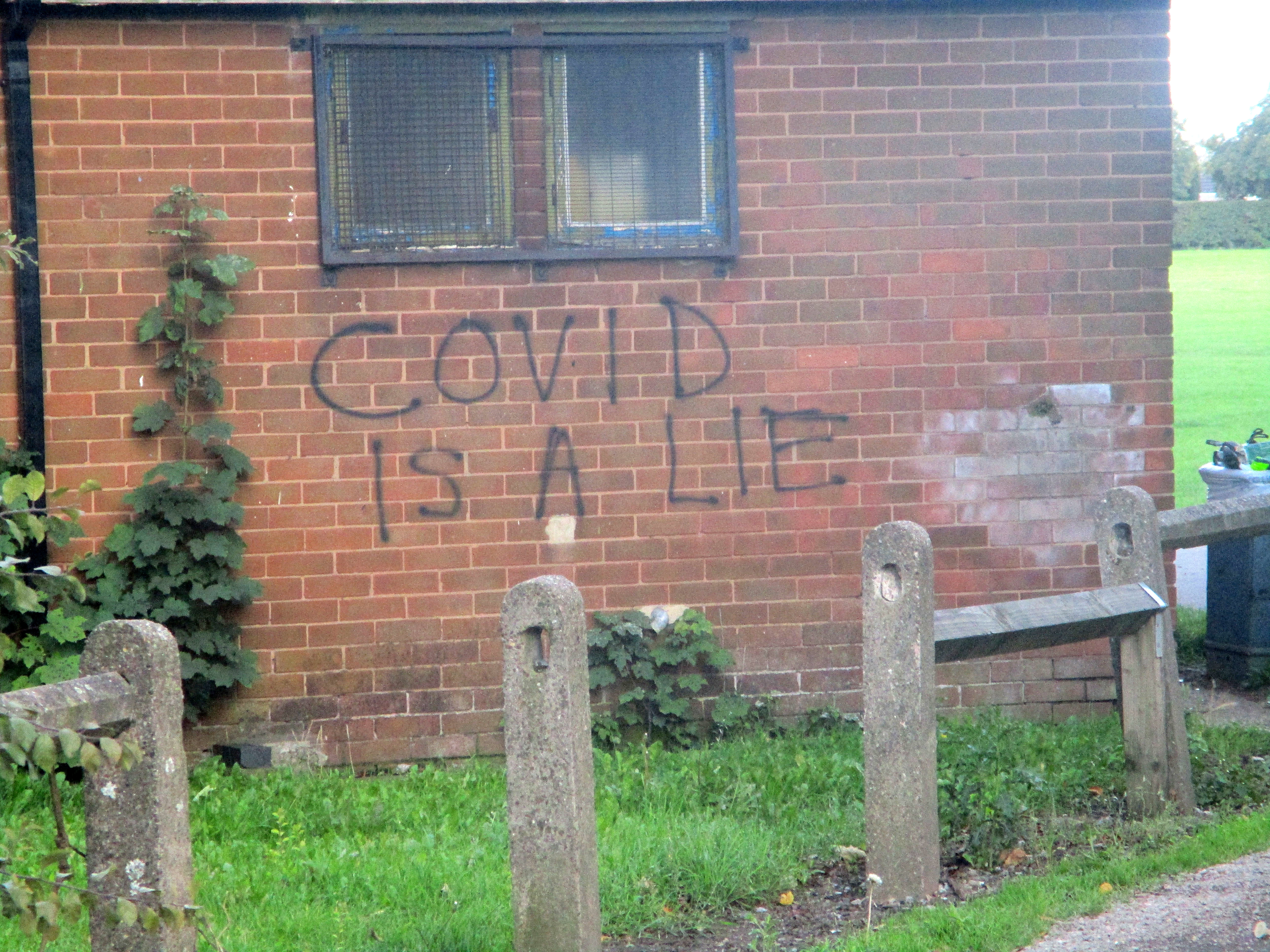
"COVID is a lie" graffiti in Pontefract, West Yorkshire, England

Some denied the existence of the COVID-19 pandemic, or denied that deaths were happening in the manner or proportions scientifically recognized by the World Health Organization. The claims that the COVID-19 pandemic was faked, exaggerated, or mischaracterized are pseudoscience. Some public figures who have engaged in COVID-19 denialism include businessman Elon Musk, U.S. President Donald Trump, and former Brazilian President Jair Bolsonaro.

In Germany, it had been repeatedly falsely claimed on the Internet during the pandemic that the German government and the Robert Koch Institute had acknowledged the non-existence of COVID-19. In Austria, a video of climate protesters in Vienna was falsely identified as a recording of people who had supposedly died from COVID-19 and were moving inside body bags.

=== Antisemitism ===
An October 2021 report by the UK-based anti-racism group Hope not Hate found that COVID-19 conspiracy theories were a primary gateway into antisemitic rhetoric, due to what they described as "conspiratorial antisemitism". According to the report, "An important bridge between COVID-19 conspiracy theories and antisemitism are ideologies that provide overarching explanations for smaller alleged deceptions. For example, the need for anti-5G campaigners to explain why telecom companies, healthcare providers and authorities are conspiring to expose the population to supposedly dangerous radiation has driven attention towards 'superconspiracies'."

Also in October 2021, the fact-checking organisation Logically found that antisemitic conspiracy theories related to the pandemic were being promoted on one of the largest COVID-19 conspiracy groups on Telegram, including posts highlighting Jewish people in leadership positions at Moderna, Pfizer, the CDC and US President Joe Biden's White House, and claims that mask and vaccine mandates were similar to the Holocaust.

=== US anti-vax anti-China covert operation ===
At the beginning of the pandemic, Philippine President Duterte had sought Chinese assistance for vaccines, easing claims in the South China Sea, and improving relations between the two countries. To counter China's influence in the Philippines, under Donald Trump's presidency, the US military conducted a covert operation aimed at spreading doubts about the safety of Chinese aid, including vaccines. This campaign of misinformation has contributed to low vaccination coverage and increased death rates from COVID-19 in the Philippines. Health experts condemned these actions, pointing out the damage done to public trust and global health. The operation involved the creation of fake social media accounts posing as Filipinos and spreading anti-vaccine messages. The campaign was described by then-Defense Secretary Mark Esper as "payback" for COVID-19 disinformation by China directed against the U.S.

The operation spread to other regions such as in the Middle East and Central Asia like Kazakhstan, Kyrgyzstan and Uzbekistan, where the Pentagon aimed to intensify fears that the Chinese vaccine produced by Sinovac Biotech contained pork derivatives, and could be considered "haram", i.e. forbidden by Islamic law.

The operation ended in mid-2021, when the Biden administration banned the anti-vaccine campaign.

=== Use of past tense ===
As early as August 2020, Trump advisor Larry Kudlow referred to the COVID pandemic in the past tense at the Republican National Convention, which The Atlantic declared "out of step with reality." Since the end of lockdown measures, the use of past tense to describe COVID-19 has become common. The continued spread of COVID-19 is distinct from the pandemic phase. Many experts feel that COVID-19 is no longer a pandemic, but they note that the virus continues to spread and remains a threat to health, an underreported cause of death, and can cause Long COVID. In 2024, Director-General of the World Health Organization Tedros Adhanom Ghebreyesus spoke against the use of past tense to describe COVID-19:

In the past five years, more than 7 million deaths from COVID-19 have been reported to WHO, but we estimate the true death toll to be at least three times higher. We cannot talk about COVID in the past tense. It's still with us, it still causes acute disease and "long COVID", and it still kills. On average this year, about 1000 deaths from COVID-19 have been reported to WHO each week – and that's just from the few countries that are still reporting. The world might want to forget about COVID-19, but we cannot afford to.

== Efforts to combat misinformation ==
International Telecommunication Union

In February 2020, the World Health Organization (WHO) described a "massive infodemic", citing an over-abundance of reported information, which was false, about the virus that "makes it hard for people to find trustworthy sources and reliable guidance when they need it". The WHO stated that the high demand for timely and trustworthy information has incentivised the creation of a direct WHO 24/7 myth-busting hotline where its communication and social media teams have been monitoring and responding to misinformation through its website and social media pages. The WHO specifically debunked several claims as false, including the claim that a person can tell if they have the virus or not simply by holding their breath; the claim that drinking large amounts of water will protect against the virus; and the claim that gargling salt water prevents infection.

=== Social media ===
In early February 2020, Facebook, Twitter, and Google announced that they were working with WHO to address misinformation on their platforms. In a blog post, Facebook stated that it would remove content flagged by global health organizations and local authorities that violate its content policy on misinformation leading to "physical harm". Facebook is also giving free advertising to WHO. Nonetheless, a week after Trump's speculation that sunlight could kill the virus, The New York Times found "780 Facebook groups, 290 Facebook pages, nine Instagram accounts and thousands of tweets pushing UV light therapies", material which those companies declined to remove from their platforms. In August 2020, Facebook removed seven million posts with misinformation about COVID-19.

At the end of February 2020, Amazon removed more than a million products that claimed to cure or protect against COVID-19, and removed tens of thousands of listings for health products whose prices were "significantly higher than recent prices offered on or off Amazon", although numerous items were "still being sold at unusually high prices" as of 28 February.

Millions of instances of COVID-19 misinformation have occurred across multiple online platforms. Other researchers monitoring the spread of fake news observed certain rumours started in China; many of them later spread to Korea and the United States, prompting several universities in Korea to start the multilingual "Facts Before Rumors" campaign to evaluate common claims seen online. The proliferation of such misinformation on social media has led to workshops for the application of machine learning resources to detect misinformation.

Party and ideology partisanship has also contributed to the public's lack of trust in messages delivered via social media channels, leading to a greater proclivity to follow fake news and misinformation campaigns. According to research, COVID mass media communication should prioritize increasing trust in scientific medicine over attempting to bridge the issue's partisan divide.

In addition, the divisive nature of the issue, being mired in existing political tensions, has led to online bullying of scientists.

=== Wikipedia ===
The media have praised Wikipedia's coverage of COVID-19 and its combating the inclusion of misinformation through efforts led by the English-language Wikipedia's WikiProject Medicine, among other groups. From May 2020, Wikipedia's consensus for the COVID-19 pandemic page has been to "not mention the theory that the virus was accidentally leaked from a laboratory in the article." However, in June 2021, Wikipedia editors began debating the inclusion of the lab leak hypothesis. WHO began working with Wikipedia to provide much of its infographics and reports on COVID-19 to help fight misinformation, with plans to use similar approaches for fighting misinformation about other infectious diseases in the future.

=== Newspapers and scholarly journals ===
Initially, many newspapers with paywalls lowered them for some or all their COVID-19 coverage. Many scientific publishers made scientific papers related to the outbreak open access (free).

The scientific publishing community, while intent on producing quality scholarly publications, has itself been negatively impacted by the infiltration of inferior or false research leading to the retraction of several articles on the topic of COVID-19, as well as polluting valid and reliable scientific study, bringing into question the reliability of research undertaken. Retraction Watch maintains a database of retracted COVID-19 articles.

=== Podcasts ===
In January 2022, 270 US healthcare professionals, scientists and professors wrote an open letter to Spotify complaining that podcast host Joe Rogan had a "concerning history of broadcasting misinformation, particularly regarding the Covid-19 pandemic" and describing him as a "menace to public health". This was in part due to Rogan platforming and promoting the conspiracy theories of Robert W. Malone who was one of two recent guests on The Joe Rogan Experience who compared pandemic policies to the Holocaust. The letter described the interview as a "mass-misinformation events of this scale have extraordinarily dangerous ramifications".

=== Government censorship ===
In many countries, censorship was performed by governments, with "fake news" laws being enacted to criminalize certain types of speech regarding COVID-19. Often, people were arrested for making posts online.

In March 2020, the Turkish Interior Ministry reported 93 suspects and 19 arrests of social media users whose posts were "targeting officials and spreading panic and fear by suggesting the virus had spread widely in Turkey and that officials had taken insufficient measures". In April 2020, Iran's military said that 3600 people had been arrested for "spreading rumors" about COVID-19 in the country. In Cambodia, at least 17 individuals who expressed concerns about the spread of COVID-19 were arrested between January and March 2020 on "fake news" charges. In April 2020, Algerian lawmakers passed a law criminalizing "fake news" deemed harmful to "public order and state security".

In the Philippines, China, India, Egypt, Ethiopia, Bangladesh, Morocco, Pakistan, Saudi Arabia, Oman, Iran, Vietnam, Laos, Indonesia, Mongolia, Sri Lanka, Kenya, South Africa, Côte d'Ivoire, Somalia, Mauritius, Zimbabwe, Thailand, Kazakhstan, Azerbaijan, Montenegro, Serbia, Malaysia, Singapore, and Hong Kong, people have been arrested for allegedly spreading false information about the COVID-19 pandemic. The United Arab Emirates has introduced criminal penalties for the spread of misinformation and rumours related to the outbreak. Myanmar blocked access to 221 news websites, including several leading media outlets.

In the United States, some elected officials aided the spread of misinformation. In January 2022, Congressman Troy Nehls entered a full transcript of the Malone interview on The Joe Rogan Experience into the Congressional Record in order to circumvent what he said was censorship by social media.

== Scams ==
The WHO has warned of criminal scams involving perpetrators who misrepresent themselves as representatives of the WHO seeking personal information from victims. The Federal Communications Commission has advised consumers not to click on links in suspicious emails and not to give out personal information. The Federal Trade Commission has also warned of charity scams related to the pandemic.

Cybersecurity firm Check Point stated there has been a large increase in phishing attacks to lure victims into unwittingly installing a computer virus under the guise of emails related to COVID-19 containing attachments. Cyber-criminals use deceptive domains such as "cdc-gov.org" instead of the correct "cdc.gov", or even spoof the original domain so it resembles specific websites. More than 4,000 domains related to COVID-19 have been registered.

Police in New Jersey, United States, reported incidents of criminals knocking on people's doors and claiming to be from the CDC. They then attempt to sell products at inflated prices or otherwise scam victims under the guise of educating and protecting the public from COVID-19.

Links that purportedly direct to the Johns Hopkins University COVID-19 map, but instead direct to a false site that spreads malware, have been circulating on the Internet.

Since the March 2020 passage of the CARES Act, criminals have taken advantage of the stimulus bill by asking people to pay in advance to receive their stimulus payment. Because of this, the IRS has advised consumers to only use the official IRS COVID-19 web address to submit information to the IRS (and not in response to a text, email, or phone call). In response to these schemes, many financial companies, like Wells Fargo and LoanDepot, as well as health insurers, like Humana, for example, have posted similar advisories on their websites.

== See also ==
- COVID-19 misinformation in Canada
- COVID-19 misinformation in the Philippines
- COVID-19 misinformation by the United States
