= Neck gaiter =

Closed tube of fabric worn around the neck

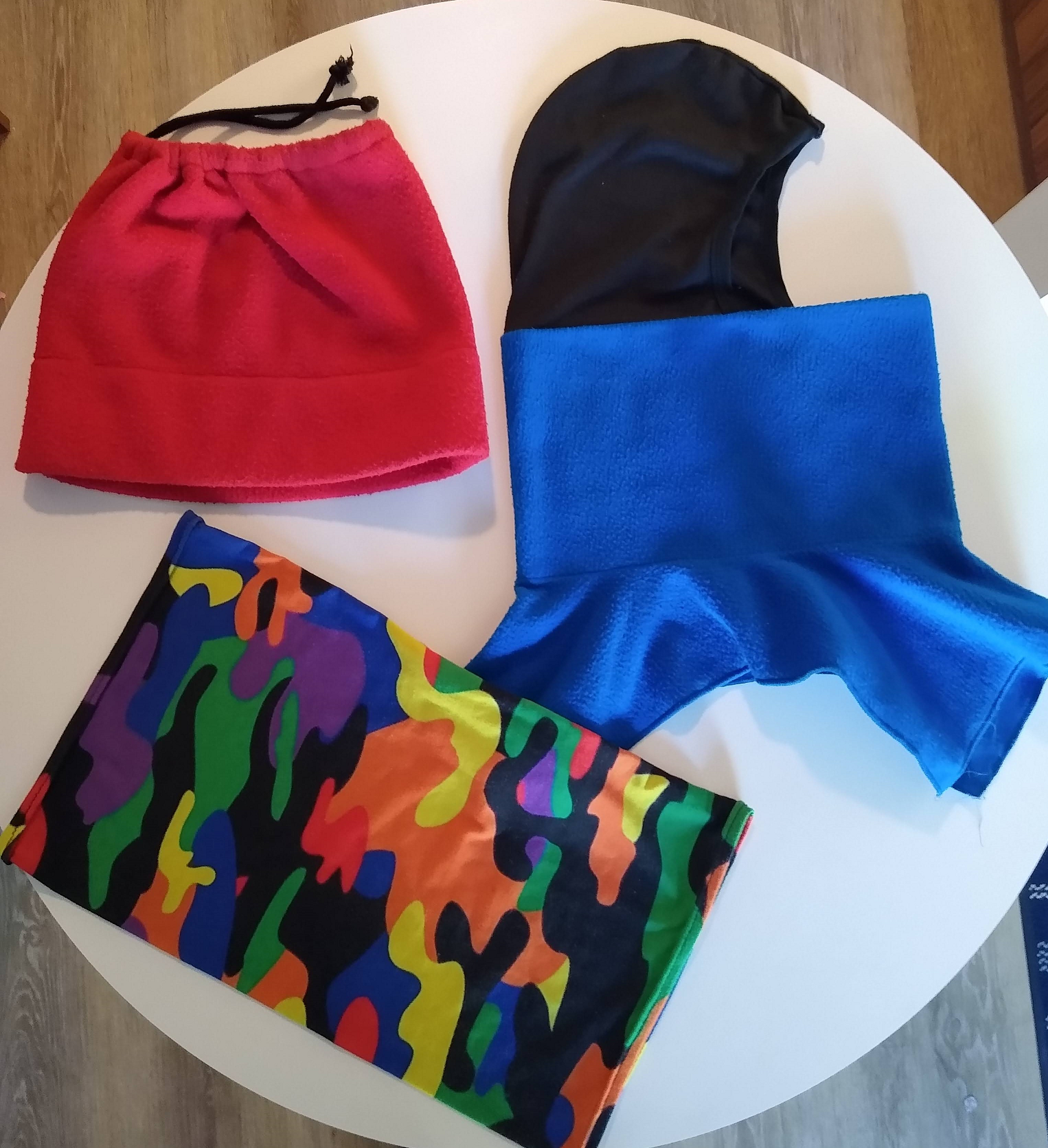
A basic neck gaiter (red), a balaclava (blue/black), and a multifunction neck tube (multicolor)

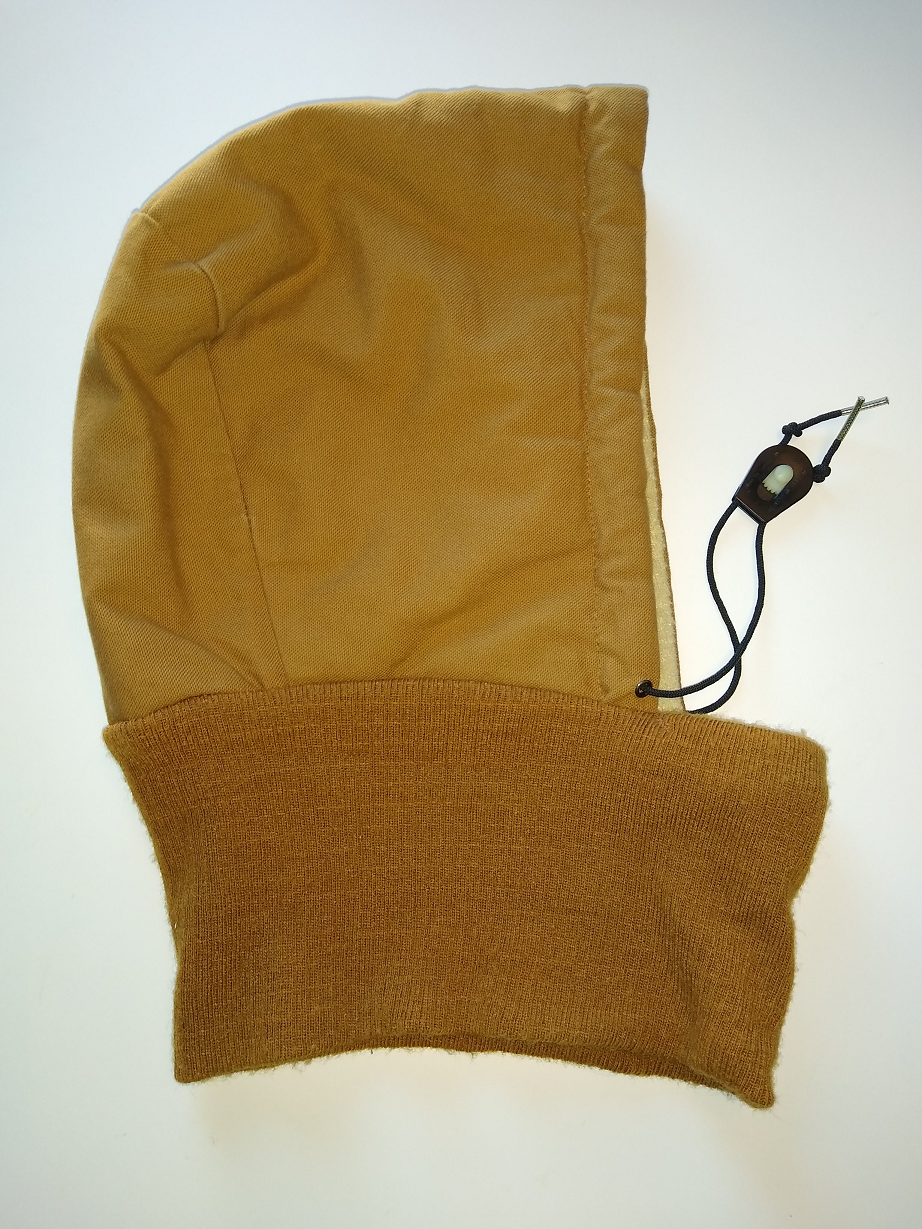
Thick hood with attached neck gaiter

A neck gaiter, dickie or neck warmer is neckwear, or an enlarged collar of a garment, that is worn around the neck for warmth. It is usually a closed tube of fabric, often thick fleece, merino wool, synthetic wicking, or knit material, which is slipped on and off over the head (unlike a scarf, which is an open stretch of fabric wrapped around the neck) to cover the entire neck and conserve body heat. Some balaclavas are essentially a small hood attached to a neck gaiter. Like gaiters for the lower legs, a neck gaiter augments the protection offered by other garments.

Some longer neck gaiters can also be pulled up and cover the lower face as an improvised face veil to help keep out sand/dust, smoke and other airborne irritants from entering the mouth and nose, to prevent cold hives and/or frostbites by wind chills (especially on exposed nosetips), or to protect facial skin from harmful sunlight during prolonged outdoor activities (e.g. recreational fishing).

== Informal medical uses ==
Following the onset of the coronavirus pandemic, some media and governmental entities included neck gaiters among apparel items for non-medical personnel to use to shield against viruses, when conventional personal protective equipment is unavailable. Examples included WebMD and Riverside County, California health officials.

In 2020, a method was developed which allowed researchers to visualize the effect of masks blocking droplet emission during speaking. However, some media outlets claimed that neck gaiters were worse than not wearing masks at all in the COVID-19 pandemic, misinterpreting the study which was intended to demonstrate a method for evaluating masks (and not actually to determine the effectiveness of different types of masks). The study also only looked at one wearer wearing the one neck gaiter made from a polyester/spandex blend, which is not sufficient evidence to support the claim about gaiters made in the media. The study found that the neck gaiter, made from a thin and stretchy material, appeared to be ineffective at limiting airborne droplets expelled from the wearer; Isaac Henrion, one of the co-authors, suggested that the result was likely due to the material rather than the style, stating that "Any mask made from that fabric would probably have the same result, no matter the design." Warren S. Warren, another co-author, said that they tried to be careful with their language in media interviews, but added that press coverage "careened out of control" for a study testing a measuring technique.

A later study in 2021 funded by the National Institute for Occupational Safety and Health, part of the US Centers for Disease Control and Prevention, found that neck gaiters and other face masks can significantly reduce the expulsion of small respiratory aerosol particles during coughing, suggesting that various types of face coverings can make an important contribution to reducing the quantity of aerosol particles containing viruses—such as SARS-CoV-2 during the COVID-19 pandemic—released into the environment by infected people. The results showed that a single-layered gaiter blocked 47% and a double-layered gaiter blocked 60% of the test aerosols from being released into the environment, with increasing efficiency at larger aerosol sizes and vice versa. However, by that point much of the damage caused by negative coverage had led numerous businesses and corporations such as Disney, Spirit Airlines, and Carnival Cruise Lines to enacted policies prohibiting the use of gaiters as an acceptable type of face covering.
