= Climate of Dubai =

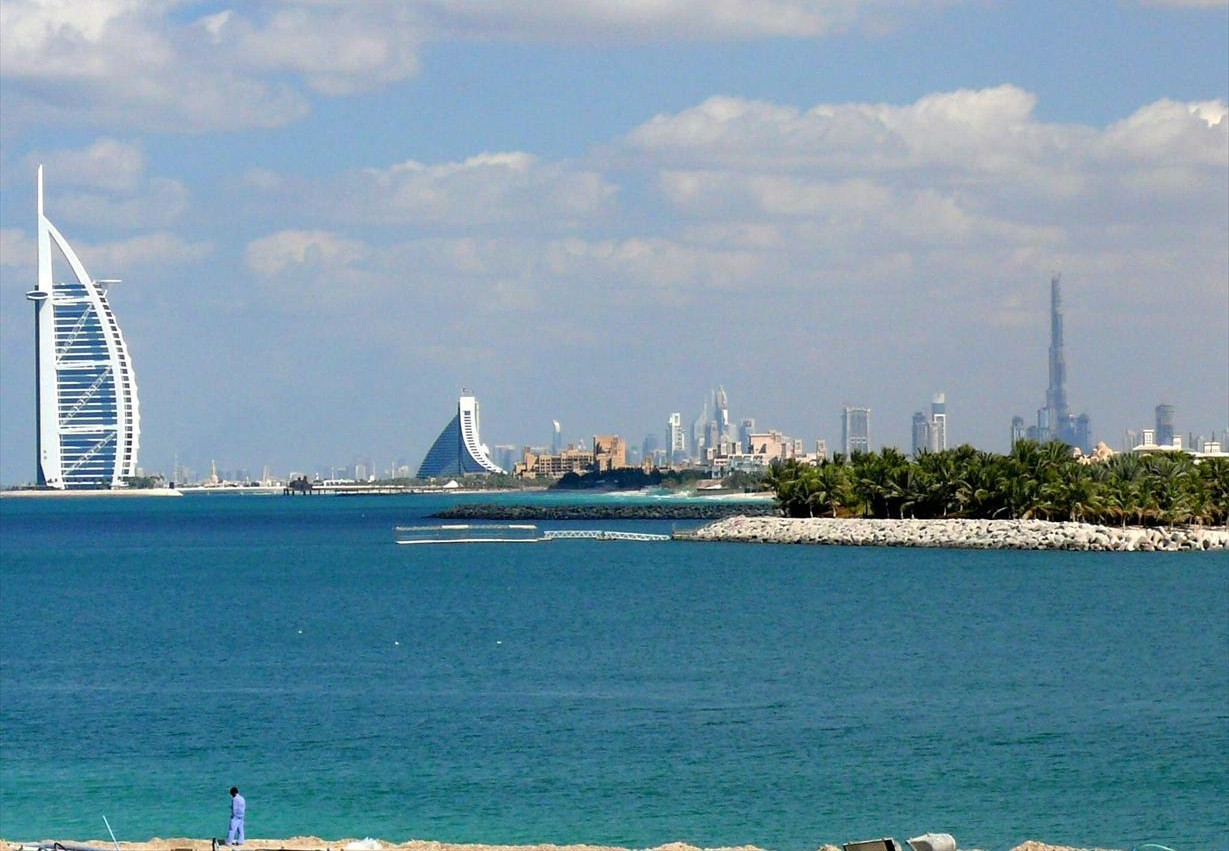
Clouds over Dubai in winter

Dubai has a tropical desert, hot arid climate. Dubai has two seasons – winter and summer. Rainfall in the city has been increasing over the past few decades in the city reaching to more than 130 mm (5.12 in) per year.

== Seasons ==
=== Summer ===
Summer in Dubai lasts roughly from the last week of April to the first week of October. This period is characterized by extremely hot weather, hot winds, and high humidity. Due to the city's close proximity to the sea, temperatures are slightly milder in summer in comparison to other Gulf cities such as Kuwait City and Riyadh. However, this also means the city has high humidity which can make summer weather extremely unpleasant. During the summer months, rainfall is scarce, but the windy conditions produce frequent dust storms. Strong thunderstorms are not uncommon and are accompanied by strong north-westerly winds and lower temperatures. Temperatures regularly exceed 38 °C (100 °F) during this period and fall to around 26 °C (79 °F) overnight. The highest temperature recorded in Dubai is 50.1 °C (122 °F), reached in July 2023.

=== Winter ===
Winter in Dubai lasts roughly from the last week of October to the middle of April. Most of the precipitation takes place during this season. Strong thunderstorms are not uncommon in the city during this period and are accompanied by strong north-westerly winds and lower temperatures. The average daytime high during January, the coolest month, is around 22 °C (72 °F) with overnight lows of 12 °C (54 °F). The lowest recorded temperature in Dubai is 5 °C (41 °F), reached on early mornings from 10 to 12 January 2021.

Dubai is also impacted by an urban heat island effect. During the winter months, temperatures regularly fall to around 15 °C (59 °F) and lower in the outskirts of the city and its suburbs, while the temperature in Central Dubai rarely falls below 18 °C (64 °F). This can be clearly seen when comparing weather data from the city's two airports - Dubai International Airport and Al Maktoum International Airport. In the summer, however, the opposite is true with average highs reaching about 43 °C (109 °F) in the suburbs and 38 °C (100 °F) in Central Dubai.

== Classifications ==
Dubai Climate according to major climate systems
Climatic scheme	Initials	Description
Köppen system	BWh	Hot desert climate (Note: Also called tropical and subtropical desert climate)
Trewartha system	BWh	Desert climate
Alisov system	—N/a	Tropical climate (Note: Dry tropical climate)
Strahler system	—N/a	Dry tropical climate
Thornthwaite system	E A'	Arid and megathermal
Neef system	—N/a	Dry climate of trade winds

== Climate data ==
Climate data for Dubai (maximum records from both Jebel Ali and international airport)
Month	Jan	Feb	Mar	Apr	May	Jun	Jul	Aug	Sep	Oct	Nov	Dec	Year
Record high °C (°F)	31.8 (89.2)	37.5 (99.5)	41.3 (106.3)	44.6 (112.3)	47.0 (116.6)	47.9 (118.2)	49.0 (120.2)	48.8 (119.8)	45.1 (113.2)	42.4 (108.3)	38.1 (100.6)	33.2 (91.8)	49.0 (120.2)
Mean maximum °C (°F)	27.8 (82.0)	30.7 (87.3)	34.8 (94.6)	38.2 (100.8)	41.5 (106.7)	42.2 (108.0)	44.4 (111.9)	44.3 (111.7)	42.1 (107.8)	38.7 (101.7)	33.9 (93.0)	29.3 (84.7)	44.83 (112.69)
Mean daily maximum °C (°F)	24.0 (75.2)	25.0 (77.0)	30.0 (86.0)	34.0 (93.2)	37.5 (99.5)	39.9 (103.8)	41.7 (107.1)	42.1 (107.8)	39.5 (103.1)	36.5 (97.7)	31.0 (87.8)	26.0 (78.8)	33.9 (93.1)
Daily mean °C (°F)	17.0 (62.6)	19.0 (66.2)	22.0 (71.6)	27.0 (80.6)	31.0 (87.8)	33.4 (92.1)	35.9 (96.6)	37.0 (98.6)	33.0 (91.4)	28.0 (82.4)	24.0 (75.2)	19.0 (66.2)	27.2 (80.9)
Mean daily minimum °C (°F)	14.3 (57.7)	15.5 (59.9)	18.3 (64.9)	21.7 (71.1)	25.1 (77.2)	26.9 (80.4)	30.0 (86.0)	30.4 (86.7)	27.7 (81.9)	24.1 (75.4)	20.1 (68.2)	16.3 (61.3)	22.5 (72.6)
Mean minimum °C (°F)	10.9 (51.6)	11.2 (52.2)	13.2 (55.8)	16.5 (61.7)	20.8 (69.4)	23.8 (74.8)	26.5 (79.7)	27.2 (81.0)	24.3 (75.7)	20.6 (69.1)	16.1 (61.0)	12.4 (54.3)	10.45 (50.81)
Record low °C (°F)	1.0 (33.8)	4.0 (39.2)	7.0 (44.6)	10.0 (50.0)	15.0 (59.0)	18.0 (64.4)	24.0 (75.2)	24.0 (75.2)	16.0 (60.8)	13.0 (55.4)	8.0 (46.4)	3.0 (37.4)	1.0 (33.8)
Average precipitation mm (inches)	18.8 (0.74)	25.0 (0.98)	22.1 (0.87)	7.2 (0.28)	0.4 (0.02)	0.2 (0.01)	0.8 (0.03)	0.2 (0.01)	0.0 (0.0)	1.1 (0.04)	2.7 (0.11)	16.2 (0.64)	94.7 (3.73)
Average snowfall cm (inches)	0.0 (0.0)	0.0 (0.0)	0.0 (0.0)	0.0 (0.0)	0.0 (0.0)	0.0 (0.0)	0.0 (0.0)	0.0 (0.0)	0.0 (0.0)	0.0 (0.0)	0.0 (0.0)	0.0 (0.0)	0 (0)
Average precipitation days	5.5	4.7	5.8	2.6	0.3	0.2	0.5	0.5	0.1	0.2	1.3	3.8	25.5
Average snowy days	0	0	0	0	0	0	0	0	0	0	0	0	0
Average relative humidity (%)	65	64	61	54	50	55	55	53	59	60	61	65	59
Average dew point °C (°F)	9.8 (49.6)	11.2 (52.2)	13.5 (56.3)	17.1 (62.8)	20.9 (69.6)	23.8 (74.8)	26.5 (79.7)	27.2 (81.0)	24.9 (76.8)	21.1 (70.0)	15.7 (60.3)	11.3 (52.3)	18.6 (65.4)
Mean monthly sunshine hours	251	241	270	306	350	345	332	326	309	307	279	254	3,570
Mean daily sunshine hours	8.1	8.6	8.7	10.2	11.3	11.5	10.7	10.5	10.3	9.9	9.3	8.2	9.8
Average ultraviolet index	5	7	9	11	12	12	12	12	11	9	6	5	9
Source 1: Dubai Meteorological Office
Source 2: NOAA climatebase.ru (extremes)

Climate data for Dubai International Airport 1991-2020 normals
Month	Jan	Feb	Mar	Apr	May	Jun	Jul	Aug	Sep	Oct	Nov	Dec	Year
Mean daily maximum °C (°F)	24.4 (75.9)	26.1 (79.0)	28.9 (84.0)	33.7 (92.7)	38.2 (100.8)	40.0 (104.0)	41.5 (106.7)	41.9 (107.4)	39.5 (103.1)	35.9 (96.6)	30.7 (87.3)	26.5 (79.7)	33.9 (93.1)
Daily mean °C (°F)	19.9 (67.8)	21.2 (70.2)	23.6 (74.5)	27.8 (82.0)	31.9 (89.4)	34.0 (93.2)	35.8 (96.4)	35.9 (96.6)	33.6 (92.5)	30.3 (86.5)	25.9 (78.6)	21.9 (71.4)	28.5 (83.3)
Mean daily minimum °C (°F)	15.3 (59.5)	16.4 (61.5)	18.6 (65.5)	22.3 (72.1)	26.1 (79.0)	28.0 (82.4)	31.2 (88.2)	31.5 (88.7)	28.9 (84.0)	25.4 (77.7)	21.1 (70.0)	17.4 (63.3)	23.5 (74.3)
Average precipitation mm (inches)	20.8 (0.82)	9.9 (0.39)	21.7 (0.85)	3.3 (0.13)	0.1 (0.00)	0.02 (0.00)	1.1 (0.04)	0.003 (0.00)	0.04 (0.00)	1.5 (0.06)	5.9 (0.23)	14.8 (0.58)	79.163 (3.1)
Average precipitation days (≥ 1.0 mm)	2.8	2.4	3.4	1.5	1	0	2	0	1	2	1.9	3.4	21.4
Mean monthly sunshine hours	253.1	250.8	288	315.6	350	344.5	340.3	333.9	307.8	300	268.1	256.9	3,609
Source: NOAA

Climate data for Dubai
Month	Jan	Feb	Mar	Apr	May	Jun	Jul	Aug	Sep	Oct	Nov	Dec	Year
Average sea temperature °C (°F)	20.8 (69.4)	20.6 (69.1)	22.3 (72.1)	25.0 (77.0)	28.5 (83.3)	30.7 (87.2)	32.2 (90.0)	32.8 (91.0)	31.9 (89.4)	29.7 (85.5)	27.1 (80.8)	23.3 (74.0)	27.1 (80.8)
Average Ultraviolet index	6	8	10	11+	11+	11+	11+	11+	11+	8	6	5	9.2
Source #1: seatemperature.org
Source #2: Weather Atlas

== Seasonal climate ==
The climate of Dubai is warm and sunny due to its position near the line of the Tropic of Cancer. During the winter season it has an average daytime temperature of 25 °C (77 °F). Nighttime temperatures near the coastline range between 12 °C (54 °F) to 15 °C (59 °F), while in the desert they are 5 °C (41 °F) with the nights being relatively cool throughout the year. Near coastal areas humidity averages between 50% and 60%. In the summer, the weather in Dubai is very hot and humid, with temperatures exceeding 43 °C (109 °F) mainly in the months of July and August. The sea temperature could also reach 37 °C (99 °F), with humidity averaging over 90%. Rainfall in Dubai is infrequent and does not last for a long period. It mostly rains during the winter period between November and March in the form of short downpours and an occasional thunderstorm. On average, rain falls only 25 days a year.

February is the wettest month in Dubai with an average of 35 mm (1.4 in) of rain. The weather in Dubai is extremely dry in the month of June with little or no rain; however, heavy rain with thunderstorm can unexpectedly fall on some days in June, despite it being the driest month in Dubai, with an example being June 21, 2019. March and December also record some amount of rainfall. The rainfall during January, April, July, October and November are about average while the amount of rain in May, August and September are comparatively lower. The hottest months are July and August with the average high temperatures exceeding 43 °C (109 °F). January is the coolest month with the highs of about 24 °C (75 °F) and lows of about 16 °C (61 °F). Dubai tends to be extremely hot and humid in the months of July and August, with temperatures hitting around 45 °C (113 °F), and with lows of barely less than 30 °C (86 °F), making it the most unpleasant time to visit Dubai. During the months of May, June, September, and October, temperatures are hot, but rather quite bearable, with average highs of no more than 41 °C (106 °F) and with lows of about 27 °C (81 °F) on average, making it an ideal time to visit the beach or swimming pool.

== Climatic conditions by month ==
Dubai

Climate chart (precipitation, max. and min. temperature)
J	F	M	A	M	J	J	A	S	O	N	D
65 25 16	35 27 17	26 30 20	20 34 23	5 38 25	3 40 27	4 43 30	3 43 31	2 39 28	5 36 25	25 32 21	8 27 18
- █ Average max. and min. temperatures in °C
- █ Precipitation totals in mm
Imperial conversion
J	F	M	A	M	J	J	A	S	O	N	D
2.6 77 61	1.4 81 63	1 86 68	0.8 93 73	0.2 100 77	0.1 104 81	0.2 109 86	0.1 109 88	0.1 102 82	0.2 97 77	1 90 70	0.3 81 64
- █ Average max. and min. temperatures in °F
- █ Precipitation totals in inches

In January the average maximum daytime temperature in Dubai is usually around 25 °C (77 °F), with average lows of about 16 °C (61 °F). The average rainfall is 10 mm (0.4 inches) of, with rain generally falling on just two days of the month. While the average sea temperature in January is 22 °C (72 °F). January is also known for having days of unusual precipitation events . On January 15, 2008, 110 mm (4.3 in) of rain was recorded in 24 hours.

In February the average maximum daytime temperature in Dubai is 27 °C (81 °F) with the average minimum nighttime temperature of 17 °C (63 °F). The average rainfall is 35 mm (1.4 in) during February. While the average sea temperature is 22 °C (72 °F).

In March the average daytime temperature is 30 °C (86 °F), with moderate heat and humidity. The average minimum temperature in March is about 20 °C (68 °F). The average rainfall is 27 mm (1.1 in) during March, with rain generally falling on just four days of the month. While the average sea temperature is 23 °C (73 °F). Strong thunderstorms often hit the city during this month, which is followed by an increase in temperatures.

In April the average daytime temperature is 34 °C (93 °F), with high heat and humidity. The average minimum temperature in April is about 23 °C (73 °F). The average rainfall is 8 mm (0.31 in) with rain generally falling on just two days of the month. The average sea temperature in April is 24 °C (75 °F). On April 16, 2024, major flooding occurred in Dubai as over 6.5 inches (2 years average rainfall) fell on the city in just 1 day.

In May the average daytime temperature is 38 °C (100 °F), with very high heat and humidity. The average minimum temperature in May is about 26 °C (79 °F). The average rainfall is 1 mm (0.039 in) during May, with rain generally falling on just one day of the month. The average sea temperature is 28 °C (82 °F).

In June the average daytime temperature is 40 °C (104 °F), with very high heat and humidity. The average minimum temperature in June is about 28 °C (82 °F). The average rainfall is less than 1 mm (0.039 in) during June, with a possible chance of rainfall that could be expected to fall on one of the days of the month. The average sea temperature in June is 31 °C (88 °F).

In July the average daytime temperature is extremely high 43 °C (109 °F) with extreme heat and humidity. The average minimum temperature in July is about 31 °C (88 °F). The average rainfall is about 1 mm (0.039 in) during July, with rain occasionally falling on just one of the days of the month. The average sea temperature in the month of July is 32 °C (90 °F). Strong thunderstorms often quickly develop during these summer months and hit the outskirts of the city in areas such as DWC Airport, Al Lisaili, Lahbab, Al Khawaneej, Al Awir and Muhaisnah areas, especially during the late afternoon.

In August the average daytime temperature is extremely high, 43 °C (109 °F), with extreme heat and humidity. The average minimum temperature in August is about 32 °C (90 °F). The average rainfall is less than 1 mm (0.039 in) during August, with a possible chance of rainfall that could be expected to fall on one of the days of the month. The average sea temperature in August is 33 °C (91 °F).

In September the average daytime temperature is 39 °C (102 °F), with very high heat and humidity. The average minimum temperature in September is 28 °C (82 °F). There is very little chance of any rainfall during September. Average sea temperature in September is 32 °C (90 °F).

In October the average daytime temperature is 36 °C (97 °F), with high heat and humidity. The average minimum temperature in October is 25 °C (77 °F). The average sea temperature around Dubai Airport in October is 30 °C (86 °F).

In November, the average daytime temperature is 31 °C (88 °F), with moderate heat and humidity. The average minimum temperature in November is 21 °C (70 °F). On average, only 3 mm (0.12 in) of rainfall may occur in November. Average sea temperature in November is 28 °C (82 °F).

In December the average daytime temperature is 27 °C (81 °F), cool to warm with high humidity. The average minimum temperature in December is 18 °C (64 °F). The average rainfall during the month is 15 mm (0.59 in). With rain generally falling on just 2 days of the month. The average sea temperature in December is 25 °C (77 °F).

== Sandstorms and extreme events ==
During the summer season, a low pressure area develops over Dubai forcing strong north-westerly winds to blow from Saudi Arabia. These winds, also known as Shamal (north) in Arabic, become gusty and unpredictable on reaching Dubai, lifting up desert sand and reducing visibility. The sandstorms may last for several days; notable sandstorms and extreme weather events that hit Dubai during the last few years include:

- On 18 April 2008, a severe sandstorm hit Dubai and reduced visibility to 1,500 meters.
- On 10 March 2009, a moderate sandstorm reached Dubai which lowered both visibility and temperature.
- On 2 March 2010, strong winds caused sandstorms in Dubai and other regions of United Arab Emirates.
- On 28 January 2011, a sandstorm hit Dubai for a short time.
- On 26 February 2012, a strong sandstorm hit Dubai and other parts of the country.
- On 2 April 2015, a very strong sandstorm hit Dubai and other parts of the country. It started to clear out closer to the evening. In some areas visibility was reduced to 500 metres.
- On 1 March 2019, a strong sandstorm hit Dubai along with very strong winds after heavy rainfall, bringing temperatures down by 10 °C (50 °F).
- On 21 June 2019, after scorching hot temperatures of about 49 °C (120 °F) in the afternoon, the weather broke down into a strong sandstorm, which caused thunderstorms to rumble in parts of Dubai along with heavy rain, causing temperatures to drop sharply to about 32 °C (90 °F). This is one of the rarest rainfall to ever occur in Dubai in the month of June.
- From 7 January to around 12 January 2020, record-breaking rain hit Dubai and other regions of the UAE. The incessant storms brought strong winds and hailstorms and brought down temperatures severely. Unusually heavy rain hit Dubai, with rainfall reaching 150 mm/hour for 2.5 hours, according to preliminary reports, the storms also flooded various regions of the emirate, including the Dubai Airport, leading to the cancellation of most flights.
- A cold wave hit the UAE from 6 January to 12, 2021. Temperatures dipped in Dubai as well. In the city temperatures dipped to 8 °C (46 °F), and in the outskirts to 5 °C (41 °F).
- On 17 July 2021, dust and sandstorm hit Dubai followed by heavy rain.
- From 31 December 2021 to 2 January 2022, heavy rainfall hit Dubai, with most areas of the city receiving over 60 millimeters of rainfall in two days time and reaching to even 140 millimeters in various areas of the city.
- From 21 January to 24, 2022, a minor cold wave hit Dubai accompanied by strong and cool winds, with day time temperatures settling around 17 °C (63 °F) and falling to 10 °C (50 °F) at dawn in the city and to 8 °C (46 °F) in the outskirts.
- From 26 July to 28, 2022, heavy rainfall lashed in Dubai along with other emirates including Sharjah, Ras al Khaimah and Fujairah. Temperatures rapidly dipped from 43 °C (109 °F) to 26 °C (79 °F). Large floods occurred in most areas due to the intense rain, affecting residents.
- On 14 August 2022, a severe sandstorm hit Dubai and other emirates, reducing visibility to 500 meters.
- From 25 January to 27 2023, record breaking rainfall hit Dubai, with a 100mm of rain falling in the span of just 3 days, further temperatures stayed between 18 °C and 9 °C for 3 days.
- On 21 March 2023, a severe thunderstorm hit Dubai, Abu Dhabi, Sharjah and the Northern Emirates causing temperatures to drop to between 12 °C (54 °F) and 17 °C (63 °F).
- 2023 April was notoriously cool in Dubai, with the 40 °C (104 °F) benchmark not being reached the whole month, the first time since records began.
- On the morning of 8 May, temperature fell to 17 °C (63 °F) marking the coldest May temperature in decades.
- On 2 June 2023, Dubai has marked another minimum record with strong wind gusts reaching 40 km/h (25 mph) reducing the outdoor maximum temperature to 35 °C (95 °F) in the afternoon instead of the usual average high of 40 °C (104 °F) on the same day. The following day, on the early morning of 3 June 2023, temperatures fell down to 24 °C (75 °F) in the city and 21 °C (70 °F) in the outskirts, marking another coldest June temperature in decades.
- On 15 July and 16, 2023, Dubai marked the hottest temperatures ever recorded where it reached 49 °C (120 °F) in the afternoon, and with the highest low temperature of 37 °C (99 °F) at night, this has been the hottest recorded temperature for decades.
- On 16 April 2024, a record breaking rainstorm hit Dubai, producing 255 mm (10.04 in) of rainfall. The extreme weather conditions were predicted by United Arab Emirates National Center of Meteorology (NCM) on 10 April. The annual average in the UAE averages between 140 and 200 mm. Accusations that the storm had been preceded by cloud seeding were denied by the UAE National Center of Meteorology (NCM), which coordinates cloud seeding missions in the region. as well as international experts.
- With just being 5 months into the year, 2024 has already been the wettest year for Dubai on record with the total rainfall received in this time period ranging between 275 mm (10.83 in) to 325 mm (12.80 in) across Dubai, almost three times the average annual precipitation of a 100 mm.
- Between 10 June and 29 June 2024, a severe heatwave struck Dubai and other parts of the UAE with temperatures reaching 46 °C (115 °F) in the city and 49.4 °C (120.9 °F) in the suburbs, instead of the normal high of 38 °C (100 °F) in the city and 42 °C (108 °F) in the suburbs around this period. Although Dubai also received a few 1.00 mm (0.04 in) of rain during the early mornings between 18 and 21 June, temperatures remained warm at about 33 °C (91 °F), which would normally be 28 °C (82 °F) on normal days in June. A similar heatwave also occurred in Dubai in May 2025, between 21 May and 26 May 2025 with the city reaching again 46 °C (115 °F) and the suburbs reaching 49.5 °C (121.1 °F), making it the hottest May temperature ever recorded.
- On 17 July 2024, Dubai's ‘feel like’ temperature rose to a brutal 62C. Authorities in Dubai have issued warnings and advised residents and tourists to take precautionary measures in views of this.
- Between 1 June and 8 June 2025, Dubai faced a cold wave during this period with strong wind gusts reaching up to 40 km/h (25 mph) bringing the afternoon outdoor temperature down from usual 41 °C (106 °F) on 2 June to a mild 34 °C (93 °F) on 6 June with the minimum temperature falling down to 24 °C (75 °F) in the city to as low as 20.4 °C (68.7 °F) in the outskirts including Margham, surprassing the cold wave happened on 2 and 3 June 2023. Rain has also occurred in some areas in Dubai between 6 and 8 June 2025, including Nad al Sheba, Emirates Road behind Academic City, and Margham, as well as Hatta, United Arab Emirates which is an exclave of Dubai. Rain has also hit other areas in UAE, including Fujairah; and Khorfakkan.
