= Pandemic prevention =

Organization and management of preventive measures against pandemics

Pandemic prevention is the organization and management of preventive measures against pandemics. Those include measures to reduce causes of new infectious diseases and measures to prevent outbreaks and epidemics from becoming pandemics. It is not to be mistaken for pandemic preparedness or mitigation (e.g. against COVID-19) which largely seek to mitigate the magnitude of negative effects of pandemics, although the topics may overlap with pandemic prevention in some respects.

Pandemics typically arise naturally from interactions between humans and animals, but emerging technologies are also expected to facilitate the synthesis and enhancement of dangerous pathogens, making bioterrorism and laboratory accidents emerging threats.

Pandemic prevention measures include early detection systems, international coordination with information sharing, laboratory biosafety protocols, oversight of gain-of-function research, restricting access to dual-use biotechnology, monitoring spillover risks in wild animal populations, regulating wildlife trade and wet markets, reducing intensive animal farming, protecting ecosystems, and strengthening public health care systems.

In May 2025, all Member States of the World Health Organization (WHO) formally adopted the world's first Pandemic Agreement.

== Measures ==
=== Infrastructure and international development ===
Robust, collaborating public health systems that have the capacity for active surveillance for early detection of cases and to mobilize their health care coordination capacity may be required to be able stop contagion promptly. After an outbreak there is a certain window of time during which a pandemic can still be stopped by the competent authorities isolating the first infected and/or fighting the pathogen. A good global infrastructure, consequent information exchange, minimal delays due to bureaucracy and effective, targeted treatment measures can be prepared. In 2012 it has been proposed to consider pandemic prevention as an aspect of international development in terms of health-care infrastructure and changes to the pathogen-related dynamics between humans and their environment including animals. Often local authority carers or doctors in Africa, Asia or Latin America register uncommon accumulations (or clusterings) of symptoms but lack options for more detailed investigations. Scientists state that "research relevant to countries with weaker surveillance, lab facilities and health systems should be prioritized" and that "in those regions, vaccine supply routes should not rely on refrigeration, and diagnostics should be available at the point of care". Two researchers have suggested that public health systems "in each country" need to be capable of detecting contagion early, diagnosing it accurately, implementing effective disease control measures, and fully collaborating with the relevant international authorities at each stage. U.S. officials have proposed a range of reforms to international health regulations and global institutions for global health security. The "entire architecture of the response to epidemics" may need to get adapted, evolving "from crisis response during discrete outbreaks to an integrated cycle of preparation, response and recovery".

=== Technology-centric measures ===
==== Biosafety technologies and biotechnology regulation ====
Potential policies that support global biosafety could make use of various technologies, including but not limited to laboratory containment technologies – for example, tools could promote compliance with existing and novel biosecurity norms and standards. Proposals to increase biosafety in terms of laboratories, scientific field work and research and development-related activities include:

- limiting research on highly contagious biological agents to only trained researchers in well-protected environments and advanced biological safety systems and disposal of biohazards.
- improving physical security and educating scientists about the misuse potentials
- review processes for gain-of-function research involving enhanced potential pandemic pathogens. While such research can help develop vaccines and therapeutics preemptively, it requires careful risk assessment and safety protocols to minimize potential hazards.
- monitoring and strengthening laboratory protocols around the world
  - Work on coronaviruses at the Wuhan Institute of Virology was carried out at biosafety level 2 with level 4 being the most secure. Level 3 containment is now recommended for SARS-CoV-2. As of 2020, the CDC and other health agencies recommended handling non-SARS non-MERS human coronaviruses and SARS-related coronaviruses from wild animals at Biosafety Level 2 in vitro and Level 3 in vivo.
  - According to a study of Indian BSL-2 and BSL-3 facilities, "there are no national guidelines or reference standards available in India on certification and validation of biosafety laboratories"
  - In a 2018 study it was suggested that there is a need "to update international laboratory biosafety guidance" "to globalize biosafety"
  - In the wake of the COVID-19 pandemic there was a "global surge in labs that handle dangerous pathogens" and as of 2022 some researchers "are concerned about [these]".
- monitoring and strengthening field work protocols around the world (such as viral sampling)
  - A small survey reported that many biosafety professionals conducting field collection of potentially infectious specimens have not been formally trained on the topic.
  - There are multiple known examples of field-associated infections.
- making deadly viruses harder to engineer
- oversight of high-risk pathogen research
- measures that don't rely on relevant technological equipment and biotechnology products (as well as data and knowledge) only being available to registered scientists and all of these scientists to act responsibly may also be possible
  - According to one expert, the "international bioweapons community" should work towards having supply chain choke points identified and help implement robust monitoring of them, such as, for example, key input material
  - One international team plans to make DNA synthesis screening available for free to countries worldwide and could establish a level of safety if regulations require that DNA synthesis companies send sequences for screening against a certified database
  - Only "approximately 80 percent of DNA providers are members of the International Gene Synthesis Consortium, which screens customers and DNA order sequences to prevent the building blocks of dangerous pathogens from falling into the hands of malicious actors". Screening is "costly, time-consuming, and requires human expertise", e.g. making non-participation economically beneficial.
  - Reducing risks from methods that "may enable the creation of (or expand access to) particularly dangerous engineered pathogens" may involve careful regulation.
  - Several technological local production capabilities create additional challenges
  - Some companies that manufacture DNA started collaboration to limit access to dangerous genes so that only authorized laboratories can obtain DNA of "about 60" lethal germs and toxins

===== Risks of pandemic prevention =====
Efforts of pandemic prevention and related endeavors carry risks of triggering pandemics themselves. These risk include unwitting laboratory escape and accidents such as spillovers during field interventions like wildlife virus sampling, and misuse of its results due to e.g. insecure commercial sales of required equipment and/or materials and/or data. However, not engaging in any form of sampling also carries risks, as it could leave communities unprepared for future spillover events and unaware of future potential pathogens.

One approach to mitigate risks from pandemic prevention is to "maintain a database with hashes of deadly and dangerous sequences" which don't contain data with a potential for danger (depending on various factors) and also "can't be reverse-engineered to learn the dangerous original sequence if you don't already know it". This would theoretically enable checking sequences against a database of recorded pathogens without maintaining a database of deadly sequences. Another approach is not building such databases or not collecting dangerous sequences in the first place. A 2014 study proposed safer "alternatives to experiments with novel potential pandemic pathogens" than some of the current methods.

==== Pathogen detection and prediction ====
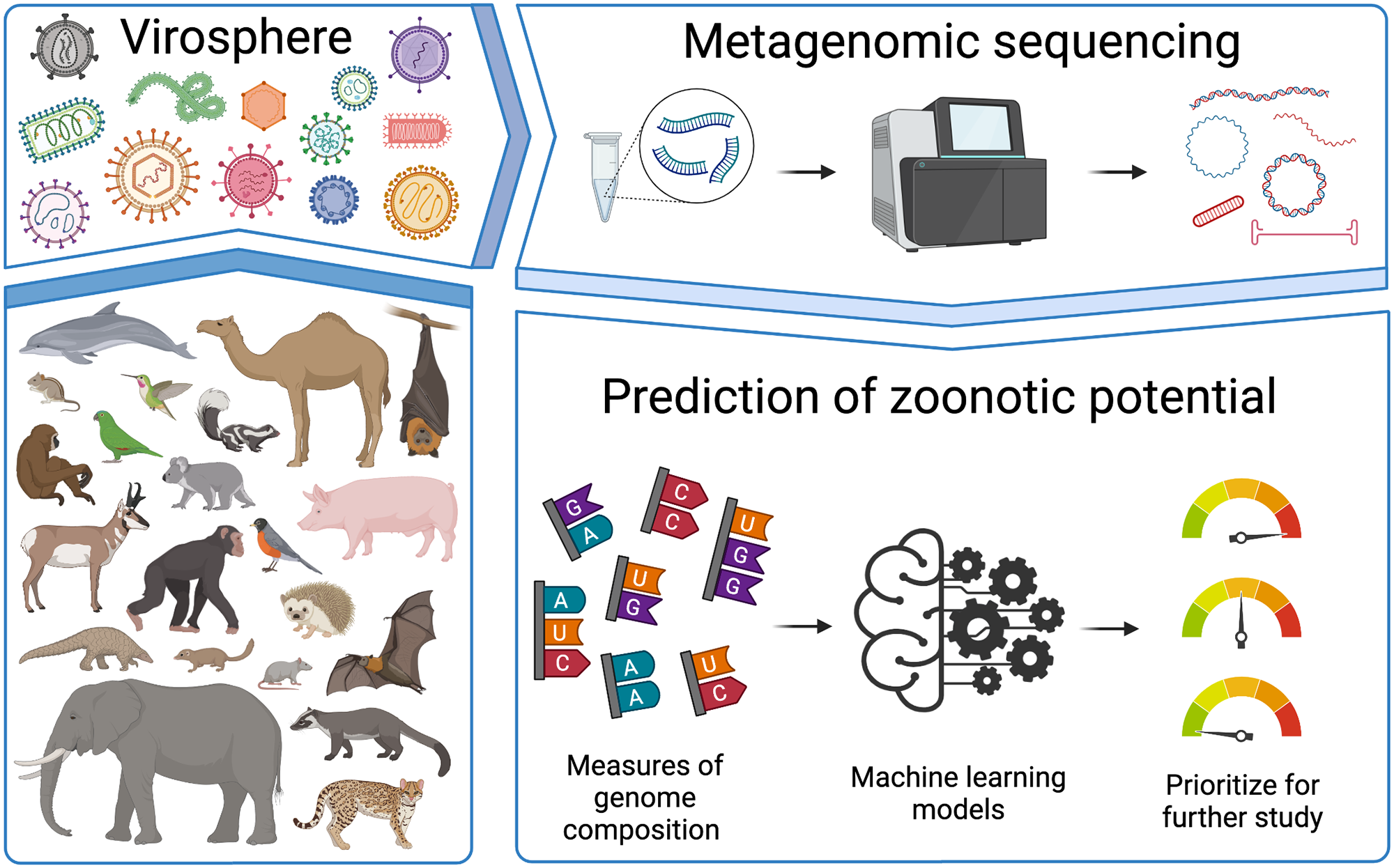
Machine learning could be used to prioritize novel viruses to identify high-risk potential zoonotic spillovers based only on genomic signatures.

In a 2012 study it is claimed that "new mathematical modelling, diagnostic, communications, and informatics technologies can identify and report hitherto unknown microbes in other species, and thus new risk assessment approaches are needed to identify microbes most likely to cause human disease". The study investigates challenges in moving the global pandemic strategy from response to pre-emption. Some scientists are screening blood samples from wildlife for new viruses. The international Global Virome Project (GVP) aims to identify the causes of fatal new diseases before emergence in human hosts by genetically characterizing viruses found in wild animals. The project aims to enlist an international network of scientists to collect hundreds of thousands of viruses, map their genomes, characterize and risk-stratify them to identify which ones to pay attention to. However, some infectious disease experts have criticized the project as too broad and expensive due to limited global scientific and financial resources and because only a small percentage of the world's zoonotic viruses may cross into humans and pose a threat. They argue for prioritizing rapidly detecting diseases when they cross into humans and an improving the understanding of their mechanisms. A successful prevention of a pandemic from specific viruses may also require ensuring that it does not re-emerge – for instance by sustaining itself in domestic animals.

Pathogen detection mechanisms may allow the construction of an early warning system which could make use of artificial intelligence surveillance and outbreak investigation. Edward Rubin notes that after sufficient data has been gathered artificial intelligence could be used to identify common features and develop countermeasures and vaccines against whole categories of viruses. It might be possible to predict viral evolution using machine learning. In April 2020 it was reported that researchers developed a predictive algorithm which can show in visualizations how combinations of genetic mutations can make proteins highly effective or ineffective in organisms – including for viral evolution for viruses like SARS-CoV-2. In 2021, pathogen researchers reported the development of machine learning models for genome-based early detection and prioritization of high-risk potential zoonotic viruses in animals prior to spillover to humans which could be used for virus surveillance for (i.a.) measures of "early investigation and outbreak preparedness" and, according to the study, would have been capable of predicting SARS-CoV-2 as a high-risk strain without prior knowledge of zoonotic SARS-related coronaviruses.

An artificial "global immune system"-like technological system that includes pathogen detection may be able to substantially reduce the time required to take on a biothreat agent. A system of that sort would also include a network of well-trained epidemiologists who could be rapidly deployed to investigate and contain an outbreak.

Funding for the United States' PREDICT government research program that sought to identify animal pathogens that might infect humans and to prevent new pandemics was cut in 2019. Funding for United States' CDC programs that trained workers in outbreak detection and strengthened laboratory and emergency response systems in countries where disease risks are greatest to stop outbreaks at the source was cut by 80% in 2018.

In 2022, researchers reported the development of an ultra-high-throughput sequence alignment technology that enables searching the planetary collection of nucleic acid sequences. The open source supercomputing-based Serratus Project identified over 130,000 RNA-based viruses, including 9 coronaviruses. While such and related endeavors and data are reportedly risky themselves as of 2021, the project aims to improve pathogen surveillance, the understanding of viral evolutionary origins and enable quickly connecting strange emerging illnesses to recorded viruses.

Despite recent advances in pandemic modeling, experts using mostly experience and intuition are still more accurate in predicting the spread of disease than strictly mathematical models.

==== CRISPR-based immune subsystems ====
In March 2020 scientists of Stanford University presented a CRISPR-based system, called PAC-MAN (Prophylactic Antiviral Crispr in huMAN cells), that can find and destroy viruses in vitro. However, they weren't able to test PAC-MAN on the actual SARS-CoV-2, use a targeting-mechanism that uses only a very limited RNA-region, haven't developed a system to deliver it into human cells and would need a lot of time until another version of it or a potential successor system might pass clinical trials. In the study published as a preprint they write that it could be used prophylactically as well as therapeutically. The CRISPR-Cas13d-based system could be agnostic to which virus it's fighting so novel viruses would only require a small change. In an editorial published in February 2020 another group of scientists claimed that they have implemented a flexible and efficient approach for targeting RNA with CRISPR-Cas13d which they have put under review and propose that the system can be used to also target SARS-CoV-2 in specific. There have also been earlier successful efforts in fighting viruses with CRISPR-based technology in human cells. In March 2020 researchers reported that they have developed a new kind of CRISPR-Cas13d screening platform for effective guide RNA design to target RNA. They used their model to predict optimized Cas13 guide RNAs for all protein-coding RNA-transcripts of the human genome's DNA. Their technology could be used in molecular biology and in medical applications such as for better targeting of virus RNA or human RNA. Targeting human RNA after it has been transcribed from DNA, rather than DNA, would allow for more temporary effects than permanent changes to human genomes. The technology is made available to researchers through an interactive website and free and open source software and is accompanied by a guide on how to create guide RNAs to target the SARS-CoV-2 RNA genome.

Scientists report to be able to identify the genomic pathogen signature of all 29 different SARS-CoV-2 RNA sequences available to them using machine learning and a dataset of 5000 unique viral genomic sequences. They suggest that their approach can be used as a reliable real-time option for taxonomic classification of novel pathogens.

==== Testing and containment ====
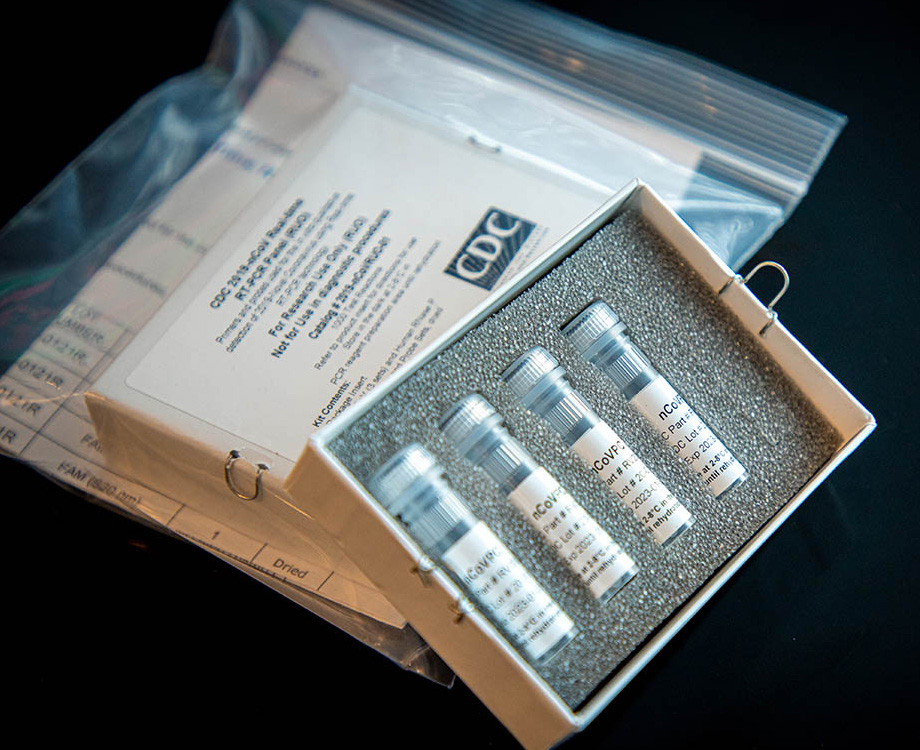
A SARS-CoV-2 laboratory test kit by the CDC

Timely use and development of quick testing systems for novel virus in combination with other measures might (possibly) make it possible to end transmission lines of outbreaks before they become pandemics. After an outbreak there may be a certain window of time during which a pandemic can still be prevented, although pervasive testing might still achieve local containment. A key difficulty with early detection and containment is that in the globalized and urbanized world, pathogens can spread rapidly to several regions worldwide via travel, before it may be possible to notice them and e.g. initiate contact-tracing and containment measures. Rapid communication of data for health systems to implement any public intervention measures may be important. A "'One Health' global network for proactive surveillance, rapid detection, and prevention of MERS-CoV and other epidemic infectious diseases threats" has been proposed in 2016.

Moreover, there are several issues with tests. For example, a high discovery-rate is important. For instance, this is the reason why no thermal scanners with a low discovery-rate were used in airports for containment during the 2009 swine flu pandemic. Coverage may also be important. (See also: pooled COVID-19 populations testing, possibly based on CRISPR) Wastewater surveillance likely cannot replace large-scale diagnostic testing, but could "complement clinical surveillance by providing early signs of potential transmission for more active public health responses".

Some argue that the best forms of prevention for natural nonsynthetic viruses would be stopping the viruses from spilling into humans in the first place, rather than trying to contain outbreaks.

The German program InfectControl 2020 seeks to develop strategies for prevention, early recognition and control of infectious diseases. In one of its projects "HyFly" partners of industry and research work on strategies to contain chains of transmission in air traffic, to establish preventive countermeasures and to create concrete recommendations for actions of airport operators and airline companies. One approach of the project is to detect infections without molecular-biological methods during passenger screening. For this researchers of the Fraunhofer-Institut for cell therapy and immunology are developing a non-invasive procedure based on ion-mobility spectrometry (IMS).

Incentives for countries to report new viruses may be important for sufficiently fast detection and for avoiding cover-ups. A global treaty proposed by the E.U. could address this issue. Rapid regional, possibly also national, capacities in terms of e.g. means, mobile laboratories or diagnostics, personnel, technologies, financial insurances and coordination may also be important.

In cases where vaccines already exist a major method for early containment is 'ring vaccination' – vaccinating close contacts of positive cases (and/or geographical areas) via existing vaccines as well as pre-exposure vaccination of people at higher risk. There are also precautionary vaccine stockpiles. Production capacities may also be important. See also: vaccine-to-variant adjustment for SARS-CoV-2 Omicron

Researchers have developed a portable virus capture device, coupled with label-free Raman spectroscopy for identification of newly emerging or circulating viruses as a major first step toward managing the public health response to potential outbreaks. It could rapidly obtain the Raman signature of a virus and use machine learning to recognize the virus based on its weighted combination Raman spectrum fingerprint, being able to distinguish between influenza virus type A versus type B.

==== Surveillance and mapping ====
===== Viral hotspots and zoonotic genomics =====
Monitoring people who are exposed to animals in viral hotspots – including via virus monitoring stations – can register viruses at the moment they enter human populations - this might enable prevention of pandemics. The most important transmission pathways often vary per underlying driver of emerging infectious diseases such as the vector-borne pathway and direct animal contact for land-use change – the leading driver for emerging zoonoses by number of emergence events as defined by Jones et al. (2008). 75% of the reviewed 1415 species of infectious organisms known to be pathogenic to humans account for zoonoses by 2001. Genomics could be used to precisely monitor virus evolution and transmission in real time across large, diverse populations by combining pathogen genomics with data about host genetics and about the unique transcriptional signature of infection. The "Surveillance, Outbreak Response Management and Analysis System" (SORMAS) of the German Helmholtz-Zentrum für Infektionsforschung (HZI) and Deutsches Zentrum für Infektionsforschung (DZIF), who collaborate with Nigerian researchers, gathers and analyzes data during an outbreak, detects potential threats and allows to initiate protective measures early. It's meant specifically for poorer regions and has been used for the fight against a monkeypox outbreak in Nigeria.

Improving "frontline healthcare provision and testing capacity for deprived communities around the world" could enable detecting, identifying and controlling outbreaks without delays.

===== Syndromic surveillance and border control =====
Expert on infectious diseases at the Johns Hopkins Center for Health Security, Amesh Adalja states that the most immediate way to predict a pandemic is with deeper surveillance of symptoms that fit the virus' profile. The scientific and technological ways of quickly detecting a spillover could be improved so that an outbreak can be isolated before it becomes an epidemic or pandemic. David Quammen states that he heard about the idea to develop technology to screen people at airport security points for whether or not they carry an infectious disease ten years ago and thought it was going to be done by now. Thermometers whose measurement data is directly shared via the Internet and medical guidance apps have been used to plot and map unusual fever levels to detect anomalous outbreaks. Various forms of data-sharing could be added to health care institutions such as hospitals so that e.g. anonymized data about symptoms and incidences found to be unusual or characteristic of a pandemic threat could enable high-resolution "syndromic surveillance" as an early warning system. In 1947, the World Health Organization established such a global network of some hospitals. Such sharing and off-site evaluation of symptoms and possibly related medical data may have complementary benefits such as improving livelihoods of workers who work with livestock and improving the accuracy, timeliness and costs of disease prognoses. The WHO Hub for Pandemic and Epidemic Intelligence is an early-warning center that attempts to aggregate data and quickly analyze it to predict, prevent, detect, prepare for, and respond to outbreaks and was set up Berlin in September 2021. It uses machine learning and may analyze data about animal health, unusual symptoms in humans, migration and other related developments that may contain detectable patterns.

===== Mutation surveillance =====
Positive, negative, and neutral mutations of the evolution of coronaviruses like SARS-CoV-2.

Omicron variant and other major or previous variants of concern of SARS-CoV-2 depicted in a tree scaled radially by genetic distance, derived from Nextstrain on 1 December 2021

In December 2020 during the COVID-19 pandemic, national and international officials reported mutated variants of SARS-CoV-2, including some with higher transmissibility and worldwide spread. While mutations are common for viruses and the spread of some of the virus' mutations have been tracked earlier, mutations that make it more transmittable or severe can be problematic. Resources for disease surveillance have improved during the pandemic so that medical systems around the world are starting to be equipped to detect such mutations with genomic surveillance in a manner relevant to pandemic mitigation and the prevention of sub-pandemics of specific variants or types of variants. As of December 2020, contemporary measures such as COVID-19 vaccines and medications seem to be effective in the treatment of infections with the tracked mutated variants compared to earlier forms that are closer to the original virus/es. Tools used in the pandemized outbreak of COVID-19 included PANGOLIN and Nextstrain. In July 2021, scientists reported the detection of anomalous unnamed unknown-host SARS-CoV-2 lineages via wastewater surveillance.

Genomic surveillance refers to monitoring pathogens and analyzing their genetic similarities and differences, which may enable (early) alerts and tailoring interventions, countermeasures and recommendations for the public, like vaccines. In terms of pandemic prevention, it may be especially useful for vaccine-preventable diseases. A problem with the surveillance for mutated variants during the COVID-19 pandemic was that entities don't have sufficient incentives (and/or requirements) to report such variants. A global treaty proposed by the E.U. includes such incentives. A further issue was that vaccines did not provide a high enduring protection against the variants. One approach to solve this problem are pan-virus vaccines that protect against many strains (in this case a pan-SARS-CoV-2-like/variant-coronavirus vaccine), possibly including variants that do not yet exist.

=== Policy and economics ===
A 2014 analysis asserts that "the window of opportunity to deal with pandemics as a global community is within the next 27 years. Pandemic prevention therefore should be a critical health policy issue for the current generation of scientists and policymakers to address. A 2007 study warns that "the presence of a large reservoir of SARS-CoV-like viruses in horseshoe bats, together with the culture of eating exotic mammals in southern China, is a time bomb. The possibility of the reemergence of SARS and other novel viruses from animals or laboratories and therefore the need for preparedness should not be ignored". The US' National Security Council Directorate for Global Health Security and Biodefense, which worked on preparing for the next disease outbreak and preventing it from becoming an epidemic or pandemic, was closed in 2018. A study concluded that the three practical actions "better surveillance of pathogen spillover and development of global databases of virus genomics and serology, better management of wildlife trade, and substantial reduction of deforestation" would have a highly favorable cost-benefit ratio. A second study affirms that if policy priorities were refocused from disease control to prevention, implementing such proactive actions would "cost a very small fraction of the reconstruction budgets".

==== Environmental policy and economics ====
Some experts link pandemic prevention with environmental policy and caution that environmental destruction as well as climate change drives wildlife to live close to people.

===== Climate change =====
The WHO projects that climate change will also affect infectious disease occurrence. It is projected that interspecies viral sharing, that can lead to novel viral spillovers, will increase due to ongoing climate change-caused geographic range-shifts of mammals (most importantly bats). Risk hotspots would mainly be located at "high elevations, in biodiversity hotspots, and in areas of high human population density in Asia and Africa". A 2016 study reviews literature on the evidences for the impact of climate change on human infectious disease, suggests a number of proactive measures for controlling health impacts of climate change and finds that climate change impacts human infectious disease via alterations to pathogen, host and transmission.

Another way climate change may affect pandemic risks is by pathogens in thawing permafrost (e.g. in the Arctic) that may have infected now-extinct ancestral humans in such regions. However, a scientist concluded that probably permafrost per se shouldn't host more pathogens than any other environment. Nevertheless, the risk from permafrost pathogens is unknown and viruses from the very first humans to populate the Arctic could emerge. Moreover, researchers have suggested more work on microbes soon to be released from melting glaciers across the world to identify and understand potential threats in advance.

===== Ecosystem degradation and consumption =====
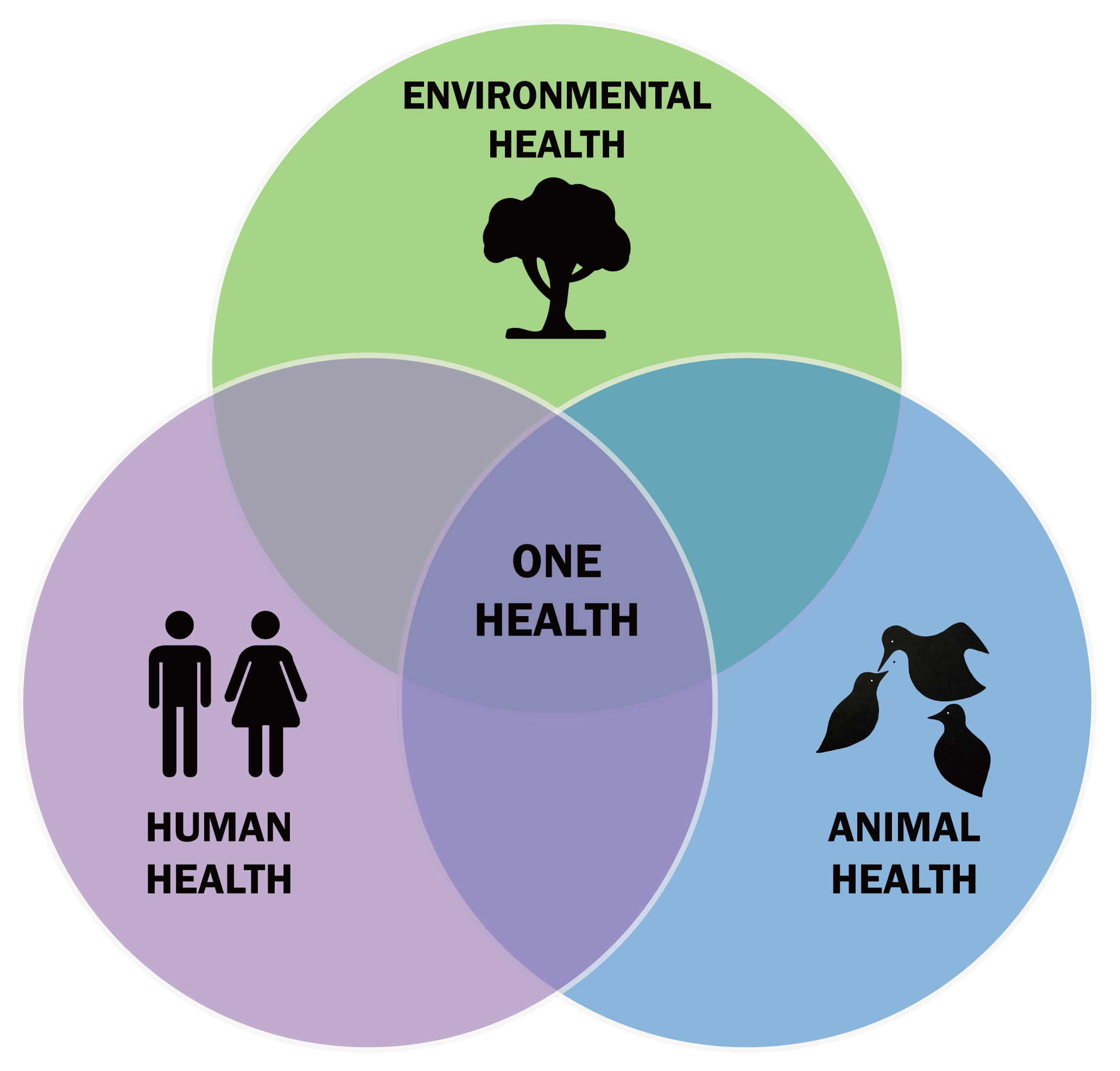
The One Health triad

Studies have shown that the risk of disease outbreaks can increase substantially after forests are cleared. The likelihood of human-nonhuman primates contact events is increased jointly by forest landscape fragmentation and certain smallholders' behaviors in forest patches. A study identified the mechanistic connections among habitat loss, climate, and increased bat virus spillover risk. Loss of biodiversity may remove natural regulation of viruses and make fleeing animals meet other species for the first time. According to Kate Jones, chair of ecology and biodiversity at University College London, the disruption of pristine forests driven by logging, mining, road building through remote places, rapid urbanisation and population growth is bringing people into closer contact with animal species they may never have been near before, resulting in transmission of diseases from wildlife to humans. An August 2020 study published in Nature concludes that the anthropogenic destruction of ecosystems for the purpose of expanding agriculture and human settlements reduces biodiversity and allows for smaller animals such as bats and rats, who are more adaptable to human pressures and also carry the most zoonotic diseases, to proliferate. This in turn can result in more pandemics. In October 2020, the Intergovernmental Science-Policy Platform on Biodiversity and Ecosystem Services published its report on the 'era of pandemics' by 22 experts in a variety of fields, and concluded that anthropogenic destruction of biodiversity is paving the way to the pandemic era, and could result in as many as 850,000 viruses being transmitted from animals – in particular birds and mammals – to humans. The increased pressure on ecosystems is being driven by the "exponential rise" in consumption and trade of commodities such as meat, palm oil, and metals, largely facilitated by developed nations, and by a growing human population. According to Peter Daszak, the chair of the group who produced the report, "there is no great mystery about the cause of the Covid-19 pandemic, or of any modern pandemic. The same human activities that drive climate change and biodiversity loss also drive pandemic risk through their impacts on our environment."

Stanford biological anthropologist James Holland Jones notes that humanity has "engineer[ed] a world where emerging infectious diseases are both more likely and more likely to be consequential", referring to the modern world's prevalent highly mobile lifestyles, increasingly dense cities, various kinds of human interactions with wildlife and alterations of the natural world. Furthermore, when multiple species that are not usually next to each other are driven to live closely together new diseases may emerge. Research shows that abundant animals, plants, insects, and microbes living in complex, mature ecosystems can limit the spread of disease from animals to people. The United Nations is formulating nature-focused action plans that could help to stop the next pandemic before it starts. These strategies include conserving ecosystems and wilderness that are still untouched by human activity, and restoring and protecting significant areas of land and ocean (i.e. through protected areas). Protected areas (which may hold wildlife) also limits human presence and/or limits the exploitation of resources (including non-timber forest products such as game animals, fur-bearers, ...). An article by the World Economic Forum states that studies have shown that deforestation and loss of wildlife cause increases in infectious diseases and concludes that the recovery from the COVID-19 pandemic should be linked to nature recovery, which it considers economically beneficial.

Dennis Caroll of the Global Virome Project stated that the "extractive industry — oil and gas and minerals, and the expansion of agriculture, especially cattle" are the biggest predictors of where spillovers can be seen. A study proposes that policy responses "addressing zoonotic threats should include ecosystem regeneration".

In the 2000s, a WHO spokesperson summarized the animal-related aspects of pandemics, stating "the whole relationship between the animal kingdom and the human kingdom is coming under stress".

The integrated, unifying approach of One Health addresses health of people, animals and the environment at once. It could "boost risk identification, reduction, and surveillance in animals and at the human-animal-environment interface".

==== Data on current causes of emerging diseases ====
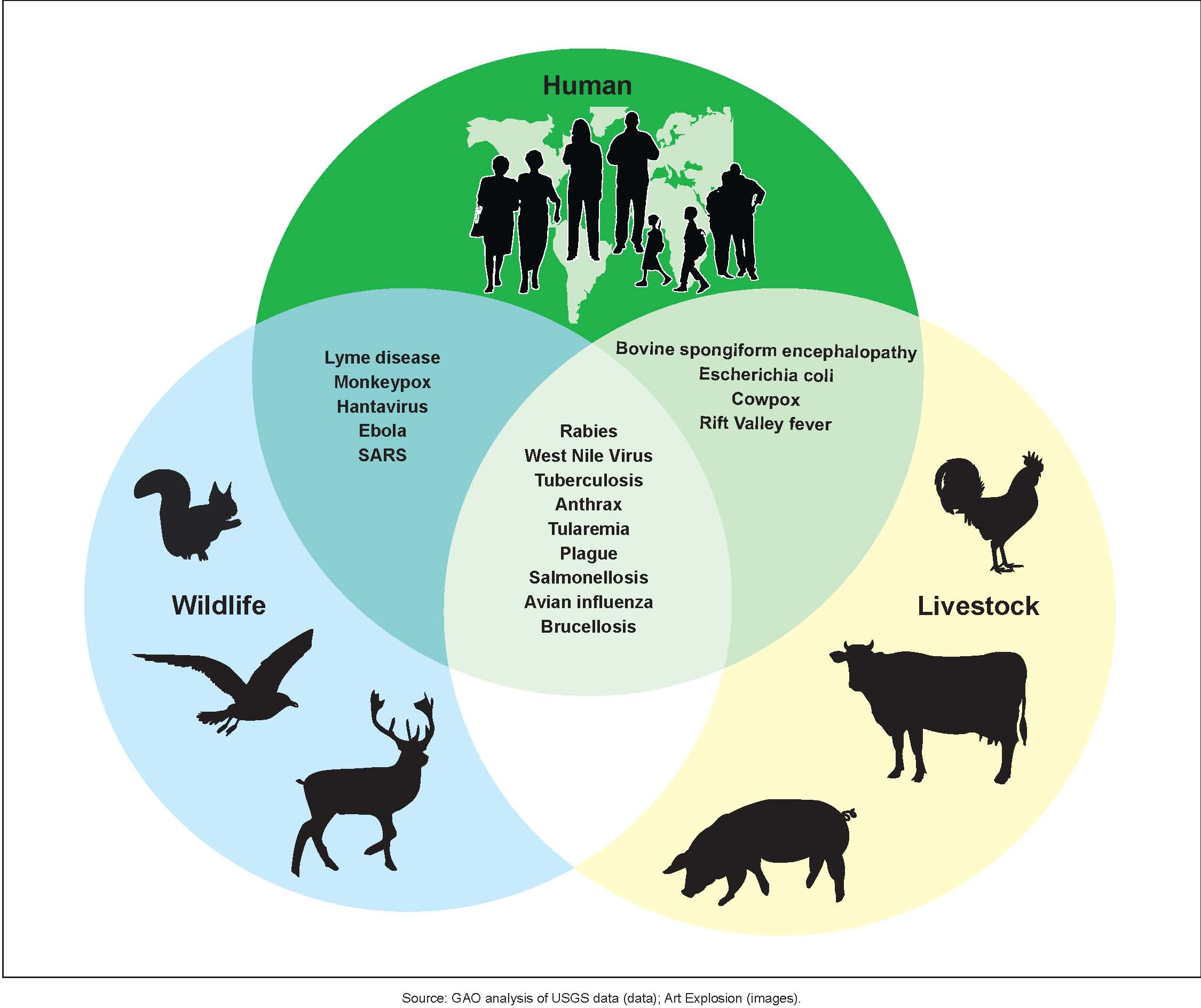
Examples of zoonotic diseases

A study which was published in April 2020 and is part of the PREDICT program found that "virus transmission risk has been highest from animal species that have increased in abundance and even expanded their range by adapting to human-dominated landscapes", identifying domesticated species, primates and bats as having more zoonotic viruses than other species and "provide further evidence that exploitation, as well as anthropogenic activities that have caused losses in wildlife habitat quality, have increased opportunities for animal–human interactions and facilitated zoonotic disease transmission".

An UN Environment report presents the causes of the emerging diseases with a large share being environmental:

Cause	Part of emerging diseases caused by it (%)
Land-use change	31%
Agricultural industry changes	15%
International travel and commerce	13%
Medical industry changes	11%
War and Famine	7%
Climate and Weather	6%
Human demography and behavior	4%
Breakdown of public health	3%
Bushmeat	3%
Food industry change	2%
Other	4%

The report also lists some of the latest emerging diseases and their environmental causes:

Disease	Environmental cause
Rabies	Forest activities in South America
Bat associated viruses	Deforestation and Agricultural expansion
Lyme disease	Forest fragmentation in North America
Nipah virus infection	Pig farming and intensification of fruit production in Malaysia
Japanese encephalitis virus	irrigated rice production and pig farming in Southeast Asia
Ebola virus disease	Forest losses
Avian influenza	Intensive Poultry farming
SARS virus	contact with civet cats either in the wild or in live animal markets

According to a 2001 study and its criteria a total of 1415 species of infectious agents in 472 different genera have been reported to date to cause disease in humans. Out of these reviewed emerging pathogen species 75% are zoonotic. A total of 175 species of infectious agents from 96 different genera are associated with emerging diseases according its criteria. Some of these pathogens can be transmitted by more than one route. Data on 19 categories of the 26 categories which contained more than 10 species includes:

Transmission route	Zoonotic status	Taxonomic division	Total number of species	Number of emerging species	Proportion of species emerging
indirect contact	zoonotic	viruses	37	17	0.459
indirect contact	zoonotic	protozoa	14	6	0.429
direct contact	zoonotic	viruses	63	26	0.413
direct contact	non-zoonotic	protozoa	15	6	0.400
indirect contact	non-zoonotic	viruses	13	4	0.308
direct contact	non-zoonotic	viruses	47	14	0.298
vector borne	zoonotic	viruses	99	29	0.293
vector borne	zoonotic	bacteria	40	9	0.225
indirect contact	zoonotic	bacteria	143	31	0.217
vector borne	zoonotic	protozoa	26	5	0.192
direct contact	zoonotic	bacteria	130	20	0.154
indirect contact	zoonotic	fungi	85	11	0.129
direct contact	zoonotic	fungi	105	13	0.124
vector borne	zoonotic	helminths	23	2	0.087
direct contact	non-zoonotic	bacteria	125	7	0.056
indirect contact	non-zoonotic	bacteria	63	3	0.048
indirect contact	non-zoonotic	fungi	120	3	0.025
direct contact	non-zoonotic	fungi	123	3	0.024
indirect contact	zoonotic	helminths	250	6	0.024

==== Bioresearch and development regulation ====
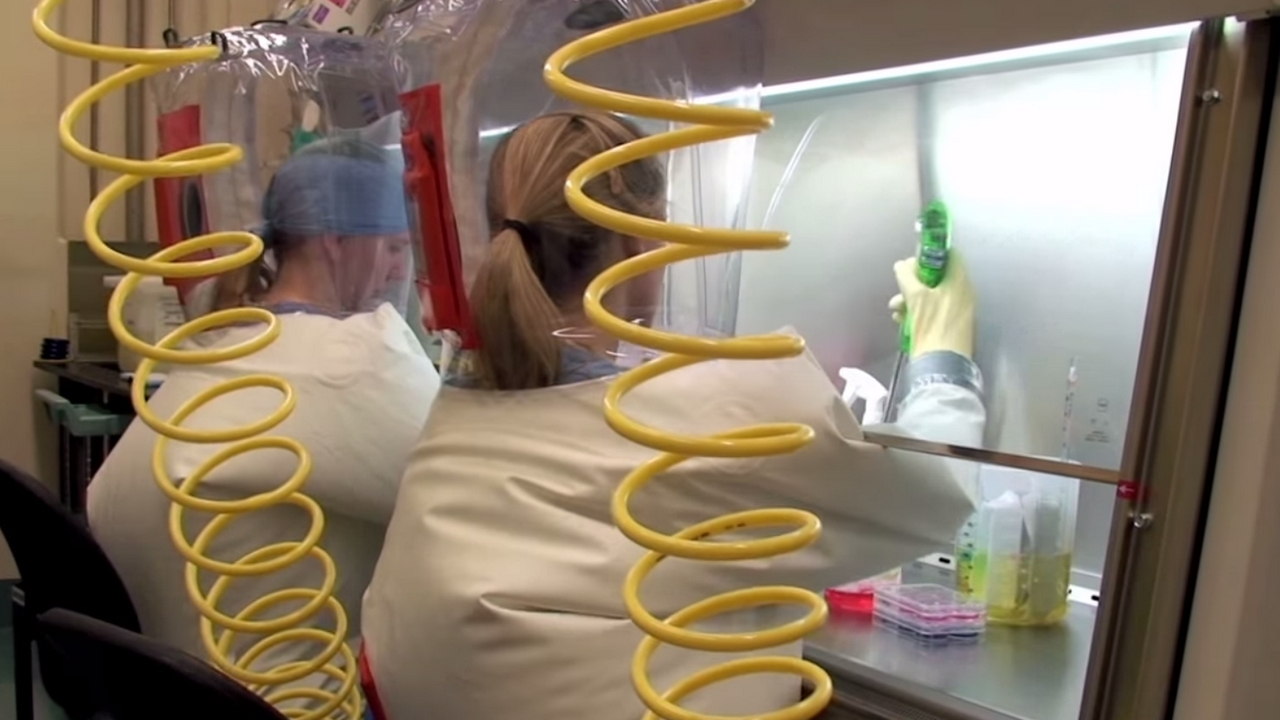
A biosafety level 4 laboratory with two scientists working in it inside positive pressure personnel suits

In 2022, American scientists proposed policy-based measures to reduce large risks from life sciences research – including pandemics through accident or misapplication. Risk management measures may include novel international guidelines and standards of conduct, effective oversight, improvement of US policies to influence policies globally, and identification of gaps in biosecurity policies along with potential approaches to address them.

Concerning systematic comprehensive identification of challenges, the Centre for the Study of Existential Risk (CSER) convened policy-makers and academics to identify challenges for the Biological Weapons Convention (BWC) in 2017. A key issue identified was that the rapid rate of progress in relevant sciences and technologies has made it very difficult for governance bodies including the BWC to keep pace. Luke Kemp, a member of CSER, notes that "just a few key countries [are] blocking regulation of catastrophic hazards" and that "[f]or biological weapons it was the US who was the primary culprit in preventing the adoption of a global verification scheme under the Biological Weapons Convention" and suggests that "attempts at regulation are often delayed, distorted or destroyed".

A 2021 Nuclear Threat Initiative (NTI) report concluded that "[t]he international system for governing dual-use biological research is neither prepared to meet today's security requirements, nor is it ready for significantly expanded challenges in the future". Toby Ord, author of the book The Precipice: Existential Risk and the Future of Humanity which addresses the issue, puts into question whether current public health and international conventions, and self-regulation by biotechnology companies and scientists are adequate. As of 2017, there is "no concerted international approach to identify, collect, analyze, and disseminate lessons and best practices in strengthening the organizational culture of life sciences research laboratories worldwide" in terms of biosafety, biosecurity, and responsible conduct, albeit a number of international treaties and partnerships do exist. Around 2022, the International Biosecurity and Biosafety Initiative for Science (IBBIS) was set up by the NTI to improve biosecurity and biosafety, calling i.a. for tighter controls on custom-order DNA companies.

The WHO has published the "Global guidance framework for the responsible use of the life sciences: mitigating biorisks and governing dual-use research" in 2022.

In the context of the 2019–2020 coronavirus pandemic Neal Baer writes that the "public, scientists, lawmakers, and others" "need to have thoughtful conversations about gene editing now". Ensuring the biosafety level of laboratories may also be an important component of pandemic prevention. This issue may have gotten additional attention in 2020 after news outlets reported that U.S. State Department cables indicate that, although there may be no conclusive proof at the moment, the COVID-19 virus responsible for the COVID-19 pandemic may, possibly, have accidentally come from a Wuhan (China) laboratory, studying bat coronaviruses that included modifying virus genomes to enter human cells, and determined to be unsafe by U.S. scientists in 2018, rather than from a natural source. As of 18 May 2020, an official UN investigation into the origins of the COVID-19 virus, supported by over 120 countries, was being considered. United States' president Donald Trump claimed to have seen evidence that gave him a "high degree of confidence" that the novel coronavirus originated in the Chinese laboratory but did not offer any evidence, data or details, contradicted statements by the United States' intelligence community and garnered a lot of harsh criticism and doubts. As of 5 May, assessments and internal sources from the Five Eyes nations indicated that the coronavirus outbreak being the result of a laboratory accident was "highly unlikely", since the human infection was "highly likely" a result of natural human and animal interaction. Many others have also criticized statements by US government officials and theories of laboratory release. Virologist and immunologist Vincent R. Racaniello said that "accident theories – and the lab-made theories before them – reflect a lack of understanding of the genetic make-up of Sars-CoV-2." Virologist Peter Daszak stated that an estimated 1–7 million people in Southeast Asia who live or work in proximity to bats are infected each year with bat coronaviruses. In January 2021, the WHO's investigations into the origin of COVID-19 was launched. In early 2021, the hypothesis of a laboratory cause of the pandemic received renewed interest and expert consideration due to renewed media discussion.

On 6 May 2024, the White House released an official policy to more safely manage medical research projects involving potentially hazardous pathogens, including viruses and bacteria, that may pose a risk of a pandemic.

While biotechnology policies can substantially reduce the risk of a serious catastrophe, it may be important that relevant steps are initiated immediately and on a global basis.

==== Dual-use research ====
"Dual-use" refers to technology that can be used for both civilian and military applications. Martin Rees, author of the book Our Final Hour which addresses this issue, states that while better understanding of viruses may allow for an improved capability to develop vaccines it may also lead to an increase in "the spread of 'dangerous knowledge' that would enable mavericks to make viruses more virulent and transmissible than they naturally are". Different accelerations and priorizations of research may however be critical to pandemic prevention. A multitude of factors shape which knowledge about viruses with different use-cases, including vaccine-development, can be used by whom. Rees also states that "the global village will have its village idiots, and they will have global range".

Experts have clarified that, for example, the definition of "dual use" is not well known and that the international community should better engage with the DIY bio community or biohacker students and in a way that does not stifle "localised innovation for peaceful purposes or people wanting to learn about biology". As of 2022, only very few sophisticated centers could recreate SARS-CoV-2 However, for example the progress in genetic engineering enabled all the tools needed to create a virus to be "cheap, simple, and readily available".

A biodefense expert cautions that overly strict rules "could prompt researchers to move their experiments to nations with less stringent oversight", suggesting there to be a need for international policies.

Since 2013, the US government has enforced regulations for "dual use research of concern", a specific subset of dual use research involving pathogens and toxins that has the highest potential for generating information that could be misused. In 2022, 94% of countries still had no national-level oversight measures for dual-use research. . The UK government in 2025 also published a policy regarding managing risks of misuse of certain types of biological research, with a particular focus on pandemic pathogens.

The increasing application of AI to biological research, including pathogen and toxin research, has resulted in some experts calling for increased oversight of AI models and sensitive biological datasets. In testimony to the United States Congress, Center for Health Security professor Jassi Pannu noted that risk assessment for AI models that could be used to engineer pandemic pathogens is needed.

==== Food markets and wild animal trade ====
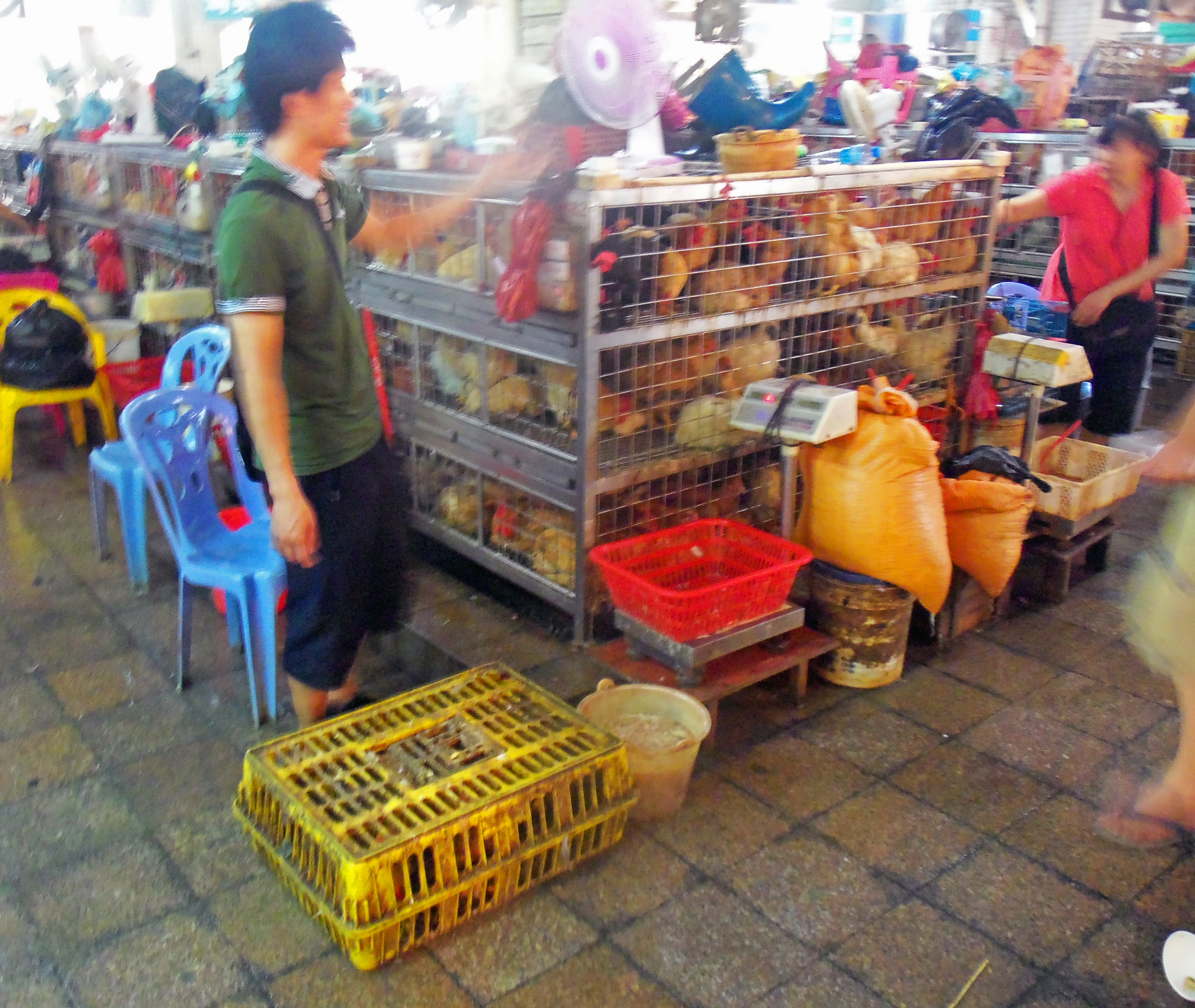
Fowl cages at wet market in Shenzhen, China

In January 2020 during the SARS-CoV 2 outbreak experts in and outside China warned that wild animal markets, where the virus originated from, should be banned worldwide. Some scientists point out that banning informal wet markets worldwide isn't the appropriate solution as fridges aren't available in many places and because much of the food for Africa and Asia is provided through such traditional markets. Some also caution that simple bans may force traders underground, where they may pay less attention to hygiene and some state that it's wild animals rather than farmed animals that are the natural hosts of many viruses. National Geographic's Jonathan Kolby cautions about the risks and vulnerabilities present in the massive legal wildlife trade. Helping ensure people are provided with viable and profitable alternatives to the wildlife trade is also important.

Some traditional medicines (i.e. traditional African medicine, TCM) still use animal-based substances. Since these can trigger zoonosis, a possible prevention could be changes to handbooks for practitioners of such traditional medicines (i.e. exclusion of animal-based substances). Senior adviser and veterinary epidemiologist at the National Food Institute at the Technical University of Denmark Ellis-Iversen states that in agricultural animal health "outbreaks of exotic disease in well-regulated countries rarely get big because we identify and control them right away". New York City's Bronx Zoo's head veterinarian Paul Calle states that usually emerging infectious diseases from animals are the result from wildlife consumption and distribution on a commercial scale rather than a lone person hunting to feed their family.

UN biodiversity chief, bipartisan lawmakers, experts and scientists have called for a global ban of wetmarkets and wildlife trade. On January 26 China banned the trade of wild animals until the end of the coronavirus epidemic at the time. On February 24 China announced a permanent ban on wildlife trade and consumption with some exceptions. In early 2022 it was reported that the E.U. "is pushing for a global deal aimed at preventing new pandemics that could include a ban [a gradual shutdown] on wildlife markets".

==== International coordination ====
The Global Health Security Agenda (GHSA) a network of countries, international organizations, NGOs and companies that aim to improve the world's ability to prevent, detect, and respond to infectious diseases. Sixty-seven countries have signed onto the GHSA framework. Funding for the GHSA has been reduced since the launch in 2014, both in the US and globally. The 194 WHO member states agreed in December 2021 to begin negotiations on the International Treaty on Pandemic Prevention, Preparedness and Response. On the 2021 Global Health Summit, the G20 communicated to commit to promote a set of principles in the Rome Declaration. The new financial intermediary fund (FIF) for pandemic prevention, preparedness, and response (PPR) was officially established by in September 2022, hosted by the World Bank with technical leadership from WHO.

In a 2018 lecture in Boston Bill Gates called for a global effort to build a comprehensive pandemic preparedness and response system. During the COVID-19 pandemic he called upon world leaders to "take what has been learned from this tragedy and invest in systems to prevent future outbreaks". In a 2015 TED Talk he warned that "if anything kills over 10 million people in the next few decades, it's most likely to be a highly infectious virus rather than a war". Numerous prominent, authoritative, expert or otherwise influential figures have similarly warned about elevated, underprepared or contemporary risks of pandemics and the need for efforts on an "international scale" long before 2015 and since at least 1988. Later warnings include a 2015 study which concluded that "a potential risk of SARS-CoV re-emergence from viruses currently circulating in bat populations". Unlike for climate change, which is by now "widely agreed to be among the world's most important problems", there are no large social movements dedicated to solving pandemic prevention.

Some have provided suggestions for organizational or coordinative preparedness for pandemic prevention including a mechanism by which many major economic powers pay into a global insurance fund which "could compensate a nation for economic losses if it acts quickly to close areas to trade and travel in order to stop a dangerous outbreak at its source" or, similarly, sovereign or regional-level epidemic-insurance policies. International collaboration including cooperative research and information-sharing has also been considered vital.

As an example of domestic coordination, U.S. Senator Dianne Feinstein called for the creation of a new interagency government entity, the Center for Combating Infectious Disease which would combine analytical and operational functions "to oversee all aspects of preventing, detecting, monitoring, and responding to major outbreaks such as coronavirus" and get provided with data and expertise by the Centers for Disease Control and Prevention. The U.S. has also set up a "Global Zoonotic Disease Task Force" who would help "ensure an integrated approach to preventing, detecting, preparing for, and responding to zoonotic spillover". However, "global preparedness is greater than the sum of national preparedness" and lacks concerted, collective and coordinated action.

John Davenport advises to abandon widespread libertarian ideology which, according to him, "denies the importance of public goods or refuses to recognize their scope". According to the CDC, investing in global health security and improving the organization's ability to prevent, detect, and respond to diseases could protect the health of American citizens as well as avert catastrophic costs. Dennis Carroll argues for a "marriage" between scientific discovery and political decision-making and policy formulation. Strengthened global governance – using facts, data, and science – with an emphasis on transparency and accountability and independent monitoring are important.

A study found there to be a need "for a renewed framework for global collective action that ensures conformity with international regulations and promotes effective prevention and response to pandemic infectious diseases" and recommended "greater authority for a global governing body, an improved ability to respond to pandemics, an objective evaluation system for national core public health capacities, more effective enforcement mechanisms, independent and sustainable funding, representativeness, and investment from multiple sectors, among others". Researchers found "a leader-level global council" to be required "to identify gaps in preparedness and response, mobilize finances, hold public and private stakeholders accountable, and provide leadership at the first hint of a threat", including "faster detection and reporting of outbreaks and threats" by a more independent and better financed World Health Organization.

Proposed novel organizations also include an entity or entities tasked with "reducing the risk of catastrophic events due to accidents or deliberate abuse of bioscience and biotechnology".

=== Artificial induction of immunity and/or biocides ===
Outbreaks could be contained or delayed – to enable other containment-measures – or prevented by artificial induction of immunity and/or biocides in combination with other measures that include prediction or early detection of infectious human diseases.

Broad-spectrum antimicrobials, rapid antibody or drug development, development platforms, and quick drug repurposing and medication provisioning may also be potential ways to prevent outbreak from becoming pandemics. In FY2016, DARPA initiated the Pandemic Prevention Platform (P3) program aimed at the "rapid discovery, testing, and manufacture of antibody treatments to fight any emerging disease threat". The SARS-CoV-2 Omicron variant escaped the majority of existing SARS-CoV-2 neutralizing antibodies, including of sera from vaccinated and convalescent individuals.

==== Vaccination ====
Development and provision of new vaccines usually takes years. The Coalition for Epidemic Preparedness Innovations, which was launched in 2017, works on reducing the time of vaccine-development. The Global Health Innovative Technology Fund (GHIT) is a public-private partnership fund which involves a national government, a UN agency, a consortium of pharmaceutical and diagnostics companies, and international philanthropic foundations to accelerate the creation of new vaccines, drugs and diagnostic tools for global health. It is unclear whether vaccines can play a role in pandemic prevention alongside pandemic mitigation. Nathan Wolfe proposes that pathogen detection and prediction may allow establishing viral libraries before novel epidemics emerge – substantially decreasing the time to develop a new vaccine. Public health surveillance expert and professor at Harvard University, John Brownstein says that "vaccines are still our main weapon". Besides more rapid vaccine development and development that starts at the earliest possible time, it may also be possible to develop more broader vaccines. Misinformation and misconceptions about vaccines, including about their side-effects and (relative) risks, may be a problem.

=== Food system- and livestock-specific measures ===
A review suggests that feeding the future human population would require increases in crop and animal production, albeit it is unclear which diets (e.g. future levels of meat production) they project. This would increase contact rates between humans and both wild and domestic animals and the use of antibiotics and thereby increase pandemic risks. It also suggests that "since 1940, agricultural drivers were associated with >25% of all — and >50% of zoonotic — infectious diseases that emerged in humans".

Meat production and trade substantially increase risks for infectious diseases (zoonosis), including of pandemics, whether though contact with wild and farmed animals, or via husbandry's environmental impact. For example, avian influenza from poultry meat production is a threat to human health. Furthermore, the use of antibiotics in meat production contributes to antimicrobial resistance – which contributes to millions of deaths – and makes it harder to control infectious diseases.

Moreover, selection for specific genes has made the animals genetically highly similar which could enable pathogens to spread more intensely among the livestock.

A report by the FAIRR global investor network found that more than 70% of the biggest meat, fish and dairy producers were in danger of fostering future zoonotic pandemics due to lax safety standards, closely confined animals and the overuse of antibiotics. Some have recommended food system-change, behaviour change, different lifestyle choices and altered consumer spending including moving away from factory farming and towards more plant-based diets.

Measures could include reducing meat production (except for potential cultured meat), de-intensifying livestock farming, reducing the use of antimicrobials, improving health and health-monitoring of livestock, increasing livestock biodiversity, further understanding of the genetic and functional basis of host adaptation, improving occupational hygiene and safety of farming and food processing/food (see also: HACCP and COVID-19 software (including contact tracing)).

==== Culling ====
Experts warned that depleting the numbers of species by culling to forestall human infections reduces genetic diversity and thereby puts future generations of the animals as well as people at risk while others contend that it's still the best, practical way to contain a virus of livestock. There are also other problems with culling and there are alternatives to it, such as animal vaccination. There are also problems with the forms of culling-implementation such as livestock producers and subsistence farmers who are unable to access compensation being motivated to conceal diseased animals rather than report them.

== Prevention versus mitigation ==
Pandemic prevention seeks to prevent pandemics while mitigation of pandemics seeks to reduce their severity and negative impacts. Some have called for a shift from a treatment-oriented society to a prevention-oriented one. Authors of a 2010 study write that contemporary "global disease control focuses almost exclusively on responding to pandemics after they have already spread globally" and argue that the "wait-and-respond approach is not sufficient and that the development of systems to prevent novel pandemics before they are established should be considered imperative to human health". Peter Daszak comments on the COVID-19 pandemic, saying "[t]he problem isn't that prevention was impossible, [i]t was very possible. But we didn't do it. Governments thought it was too expensive. Pharmaceutical companies operate for profit". The WHO reportedly had mostly neither the funding nor the power to enforce the large-scale global collaboration necessary to combat it. Nathan Wolfe criticizes that "our current global public health strategies are reminiscent of cardiology in the 1950s when doctors focused solely on responding to heart attacks and ignored the whole idea of prevention". Nevertheless, measures that improve pandemic mitigation capabilities and preparedness for mitigation are important – for example the development of novel far-ultraviolet light could make sterilization "easy, routine and effective".

== Historical incidents ==
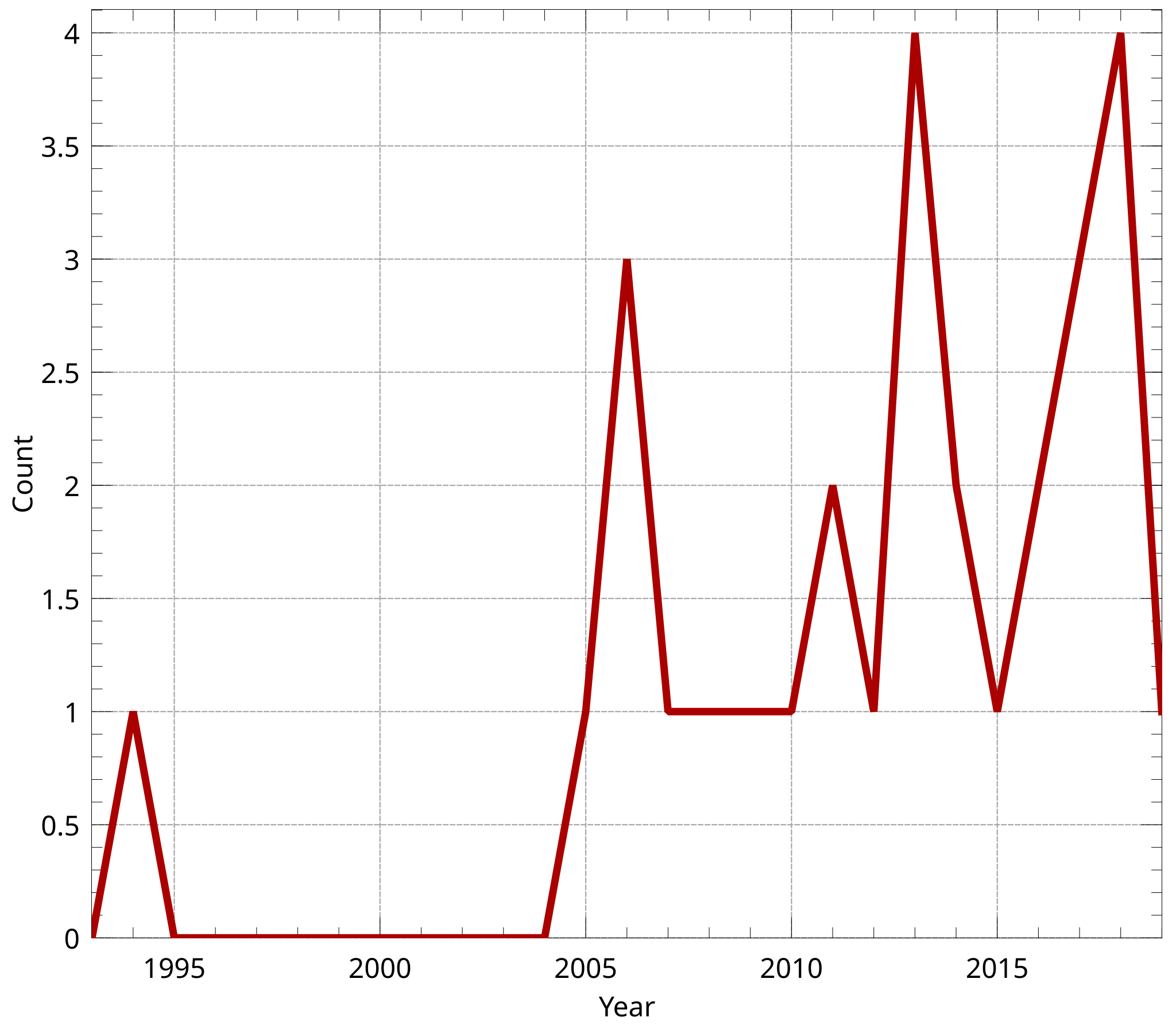

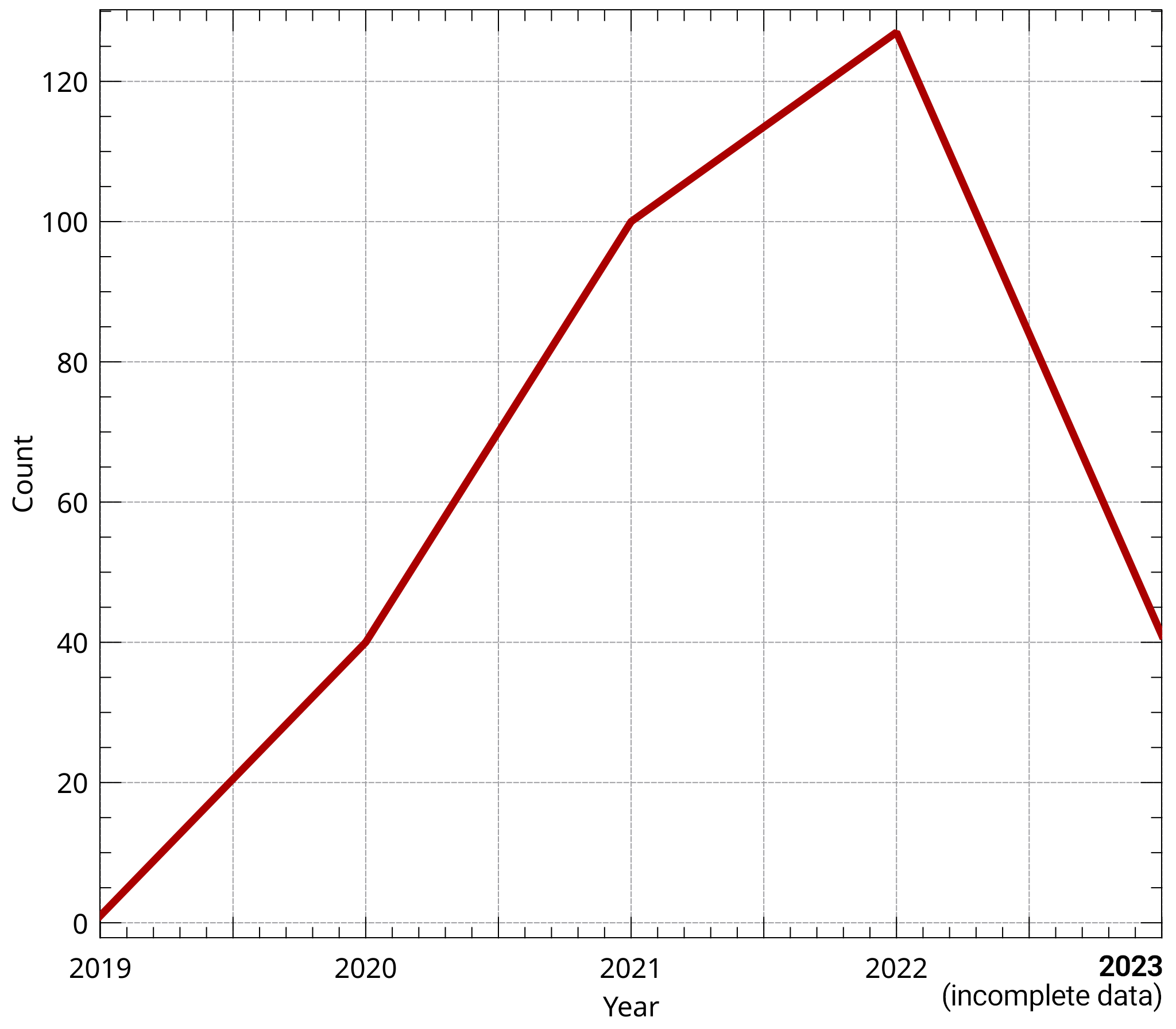
Studies about pandemic prevention in PubMed by year until 2020 (end of 2019) and 2020–Q1-2023 (during the COVID-19 pandemic); multiple studies about PP are not in PudMed or have used other terminology in their abstracts; there were scientific warnings relating to PP before 1994 (since at least 1988)

=== 2002–2004 SARS outbreak ===
During the 2002–2004 SARS outbreak, the SARS-CoV-1 virus was prevented from causing a pandemic of Severe acute respiratory syndrome (SARS). Rapid action by national and international health authorities such as the World Health Organization helped to slow transmission and eventually broke the chain of transmission, which ended the localized epidemics before they could become a pandemic. Human-to-human transmission of SARS may be considered eradicated, however, it could re-emerge as SARS-CoV-1 probably persists as a potential zoonotic threat in its original animal reservoir. This warrants monitoring and reporting of suspicious cases of atypical pneumonia. Effective isolation of patients was enough to control spread because infected individuals usually do not transmit the virus until several days after symptoms begin and are most infectious only after developing severe symptoms. Nevertheless several studies warned about the possible pandemic threat posed by coronaviruses.

=== MERS-CoV/NeoCoV alert ===
In January 2022, Chinese scientists at the Wuhan University and other institutions reported in a preprint the detection of the closest MERS-CoV relative in bats to date, NeoCoV, and another virus, PDF-2180-CoV, that can efficiently use bats' ACE2 for cell entry. The study, now published in Nature found that one mutation could result in a theoretical 'MERS-CoV-2' that, like SARS-CoV-2, can use humans' ACE2 receptor. The theoretical virus could also have a high mortality burden, since MERS-CoV had a case fatality rate of around 35%. This 'MERS-CoV-2' therefore represents a risk to biosafety and potential zoonotic spillover. The study emphasized the need for pathogen/spillover surveillance to further understand any possible threat from related viruses. The WHO stated that further study is needed to find out "whether the virus detected in the study will pose a risk for humans".

=== Monkeypox ===
On 21 May 2022, the WHO reported on the international 2022 monkeypox outbreak in non-endemic countries which involved an unprecedented number of cases detected outside of Africa. The first of these cases was detected on 6 May 2022. The main method used for early containment is 'ring vaccination' – vaccinating close contacts of positive cases via already-existing vaccines alongside pre-exposure vaccination of members of the public at higher risk.

== See also ==
- Antimicrobial resistance#Prevention
- Border control
- Travel during the COVID-19 pandemic – Restrictions by countries intended to stop spread of disease
- Globalization and disease
- Disease X – Placeholder infectious disease name from the World Health Organization
- Global catastrophic risk – Hypothetical global-scale disaster risk
- Global health
- Hazards of synthetic biology
- Health policy#Global health policy
- Infection control
- Molecular nanotechnology#Risks
- Pandemic treaty
- Priority-setting in global health
- Global Health Security Initiative
- Johns Hopkins Center for Health Security
- WHO Global Preparedness Monitoring Board
