= Gain-of-function research =

Field of medical research

Gain-of-function research (GoF research or GoFR) is medical research that genetically alters an organism in a way that may enhance the biological functions of gene products. This may include an altered pathogenesis, transmissibility, or host range, i.e., the types of hosts that a microorganism can infect. This research is intended to reveal targets to better predict emerging infectious diseases and to develop vaccines and therapeutics. For example, influenza B can infect only humans and harbor seals. Introducing a mutation that would allow influenza B to infect rabbits in a controlled laboratory situation would be considered a gain-of-function experiment, as the virus did not previously have that function. That type of experiment could then help reveal which parts of the virus's genome correspond to the species that it can infect, enabling the creation of antiviral medicines which block this function.

In virology, gain-of-function research is usually employed with the intention of better understanding current and future pandemics. In vaccine development, gain-of-function research is conducted in the hope of gaining a head start on a virus and being able to develop a vaccine or therapeutic before it emerges. The term "gain of function" is sometimes applied more narrowly to refer to "research which could enable a pandemic-potential pathogen to replicate more quickly or cause more harm in humans or other closely-related mammals."

Some forms of gain-of-function research (specifically work which involves certain select agent pathogens) carry inherent biosafety and biosecurity risks, and are thus also referred to as dual use research of concern (DURC). To mitigate these risks while allowing the benefits of such research, various governments have mandated that DURC experiments be regulated under additional oversight by institutions (so-called institutional "DURC" committees) and government agencies (such as the NIH's recombinant DNA advisory committee). A mirrored approach can be seen in the European Union's Dual Use Coordination Group (DUCG).

Importantly, regulations in the United States and European Union both mandate that at least one unaffiliated member of the public should be an active participant in the oversight process. Significant debate has taken place in the scientific community on how to assess the risks and benefit of gain-of-function research, how to publish such research responsibly, and how to engage the public in an open and honest review. In January 2020, the National Science Advisory Board for Biosecurity convened an expert panel to revisit the rules for gain-of-function research and provide more clarity in how such experiments are approved, and when they should be disclosed to the public.

== Experiments that have been referred to as "gain-of-function" ==
In early 2011, two groups were investigating how flu viruses specific to birds could possibly cross over and create pandemics in humans: one led by Yoshihiro Kawaoka at the University of Wisconsin–Madison in Madison, Wisconsin, and another led by Ron Fouchier at Erasmus University Medical Center in the Netherlands. Both groups had serially passaged the H5N1 avian influenza in ferrets, manually taking the virus from one ferret to another, until it was capable of spreading via respiratory droplets. The normally bird-specific virus, through replication over time in the ferrets' lungs, had adopted several amino acid changes that enabled it to replicate in the mammalian lungs, which are notably colder than those found in birds. This small change also allowed the virus to transmit via droplets in the air made when the ferrets coughed or sneezed.

Proponents of the Kawaoka and Fouchier experiments cited several benefits: these answered the question of how a virus like H5N1 could possibly become airborne in humans, allowed other researchers to develop vaccines and therapeutics which specifically targeted these amino acid changes, and also demonstrated that there was a linkage in avian viruses between transmissibility and lethality: while the virus had become more transmissible, it had also become significantly less deadly. Various critics of the research (including members of Congress) responded to the publications with alarm. Others called the experiments an "engineered doomsday". Questions were raised by other scientists including Marc Lipsitch of the T. H. Chan School of Public Health at Harvard University about the relative risks and benefits of this research.

At an international technical consultation convened by the WHO, it was concluded that this work was an important contribution to public health surveillance of H5N1 viruses and to a better understanding of the properties of these viruses, but that broader global discussions were needed. The European Academies of Science Advisory Council (EASAC) concluded that all required laws, rules, regulations, and codes of conduct are in place in several EU countries to continue this type of work responsibly. In the US, where regulations were previously less strict than in the EU, a new governmental policy and review mechanism was launched for "Potential Pandemic Pathogen Care and Oversight" (P3CO).

In May 2013, a group led by Hualan Chen, director of China's National Avian Influenza Reference Laboratory, published several experiments they had conducted at the BSL3+ laboratory of the Harbin Veterinary Research Institute, investigating what would happen if a 2009 H1N1 circulating in humans infected the same cell as an avian influenza H5N1. Importantly, the experiments had been conducted before a research pause on H5N1 experiments had been agreed upon by the broader virologist community. They used these experiments to determine that certain genes, if reassorted in such a dual-infection scenario in the wild, would allow transmission of the H5N1 virus more easily in mammals (notably guinea pigs as a model organism for rodent species), proving that certain agricultural scenarios carry the risk of allowing H5N1 to cross over into mammals. As in the Fouchier and Kawaoka experiments above, the viruses in this study were also significantly less lethal after the modification.

Critics of the 2013 Chen group study (including Simon Wain-Hobson of the Pasteur Institute and former Royal Society President Robert May) decried this as an unsafe experiment that was unnecessary to prove the intended conclusions, calling Chen's work "appallingly irresponsible" and also raising concerns about the biosafety of the laboratory itself. Others (including the director of the WHO Collaborating Centre on Influenza in Tokyo, Masato Tashiro) praised Chen's laboratory as "state of the art". Jeremy Farrar, director of the Oxford University Clinical Research Unit in Ho Chi Minh City, described the work as "remarkable" and said that it demonstrated the "very real threat" that "continued circulation of H5N1 strains in Asia and Egypt" posed.

A preprint by Boston University researchers, published on 14 October 2022, described their experiments splicing the SARS-CoV-2 BA.1 Omicron's spike protein into an ancestral SARS-CoV-2 variant isolated in the early days of the pandemic, creating a new chimeric version of the virus. All of the six mice exposed to the ancestral variant died; eight of the ten mice exposed to the chimeric variant died; and none of the ten mice exposed to Omicron died. This suggests that "mutations outside of spike are major determinants of the attenuated pathogenicity of Omicron in K18-hACE2 mice". According to the preprint, the work was supported by grants from various branches of the NIH, but the NIH later denied funding the experiments and the researchers stated the NIH did not fund the experiments directly. On 17 October, the Daily Mail ran the headline "Boston University CREATES a new COVID strain that has an 80% kill rate—echoing dangerous experiments feared to have started the pandemic". The headline was later flagged "as part of Facebook's efforts to combat false news and misinformation". PolitiFact noted the "lab leak" theory was unproven, and also stated "citing the 80% figure alone leaves out key context, including that the resulting strain was less fatal than the original, which killed 100% of mice. Experts say this kind of research is not unusual and the experiment was conducted in accordance with accepted safety procedures." All research funded by the NIH that can make COVID more virulent or transmissible must undergo an extra gain-of-function review. Critics charged that, because the chimera could have combined Omicron's high transmissibility with the ancestral strain's lethality, the experiment should have undergone the extra review. The researchers denied that the experiment qualified as gain-of-function in the first place.

== Gain-of-function research of concern ==
Significant debate has taken place in the scientific community on how to assess the risks and benefits of gain-of-function research, and how to engage the public in deliberations for policymaking. These concerns encompass biosafety, relating to the accidental release of a pathogen into the population, biosecurity relating to the intentional release of a pathogen into the population, and bioethics, the principles of biorisk management and research review procedures.

== Academic symposia ==
=== Gain-of-Function Research: A Symposium ===
In December 2014, the National Research Council and the Institute of Medicine organized a two-day symposium to discuss the potential risks and benefits of gain-of-function research. The event was attended by scientists from around the world, including George Gao, Gabriel Leung, Michael Selgelid, Baruch Fischhoff, Alta Charo, Harvey Fineberg, Jonathan Moreno, Ralph Cicerone, Margaret Hamburg, Jo Handelsman, Samuel Stanley, Kenneth Berns, Ralph Baric, Robert Lamb, Silja Vöneky, Keiji Fukuda, David Relman, and Marc Lipsitch. Shortly thereafter, the US government granted exceptions to the GoFR moratorium to 7 out of 18 research projects that had been affected.

=== Gain-of-Function Research: A Second Symposium ===
On March 10–11, 2016, the National Academies of Sciences, Engineering, and Medicine held its second public symposium to discuss potential U.S. government policies for the oversight of gain-of-function research. The symposium was held at the request of the U.S. government to provide a mechanism to engage the life sciences community and the broader public and solicit feedback on optimal approaches to ensure effective federal oversight of GoFR as part of a broader U.S. government deliberative process.

== Academic advocacy groups ==
=== Cambridge Working Group ===
The Cambridge Working Group was formed by Harvard epidemiologist Marc Lipsitch with fellow scientists at a meeting held in Cambridge, Massachusetts, following a "trifecta" of biosecurity incidents involving the CDC, including the accidental exposure of viable anthrax to personnel at CDC's Roybal Campus, the discovery of six vials containing viable smallpox from the 1950s, labeled as Variola but in a box with other samples poorly labeled, at the FDA's White Oak campus, and the accidental shipping of H9N2 vials contaminated with H5N1 from the CDC lab to a USDA lab.

On July 14, 2014, the group published a Consensus Statement authored by 18 founding members, including Amir Attaran, Barry Bloom, Arturo Casadevall, Richard H. Ebright, Alison Galvani, Edward Hammond, Thomas Inglesby, Michael Osterholm, David Relman, Richard Roberts, Marcel Salathé and Silja Vöneky. Since its initial publication, over 300 scientists, academics, and physicians have added their signature.

The statement advocates for all work involving potential pandemic pathogens to be halted until a quantitative and objective assessment of the risks has been undertaken. It then argues that alternative approaches that do not involve such risks should be used instead.

The group engaged in public advocacy, influencing the US government's decision in December 2014 to suspend funding of research that would create certain types of novel potential pandemic pathogens.

=== Scientists for Science ===
Shortly after the Cambridge Working Group released its position statement, Scientists for Science was formed by 37 signatories taking an alternative position, that "biomedical research on potentially dangerous pathogens can be performed safely and is essential for a comprehensive understanding of microbial disease pathogenesis, prevention and treatment." Since its publication, the SfS statement has received 200+ signatures from working scientists, academics, and biosafety professionals.

One of the group's founding members, University of Pittsburgh virologist W. Paul Duprex, has argued (c. 2014) that the then-recent few events were exceptions to an overall good record of lab safety, and that these exceptions should not have been a reason for shutting down experiments that may have been of tangible benefit to public health. He and other SfS signatories have argued that these pathogens are already subject to extensive regulations and that it would be more advantageous and effective to focus on improving lab safety and oversight, ensuring that experiments are conducted in the public interest.

Notable signatories are Constance Cepko, Dickson Despommier, Erica Ollmann Saphire, Geoffrey Smith, Karla Kirkegaard, Sean Whelan, Vincent Racaniello and Yoshihiro Kawaoka. Columbia University virologist Ian Lipkin, who signed both statements, said "there has to be a coming together of what should be done".

Founders of both groups published a series of letters detailing their discussions and viewpoints. All authors, however, agreed that more education of the public and open discussion of the risks and benefits was necessary. Several also wrote that sensationalized headlines and framings of the ongoing process as a "debate" with "opposing sides" had negatively affected the process, while the reality is much more collegial.

== International policies and regulations ==
International outlook and engagement on gain-of-function research policy and regulation vary by country and region. Due to the potential effect on the global community at large, the ethical acceptability of such experiments depends on the extent to which it is accepted internationally. In 2010, the World Health Organization developed a non-binding guidance document for DURC, summarizing the positions of many different nations as "self-governing" and others as strictly following oversight based on the International Health Regulations, the Biological and Toxin Weapons Convention (BTWC), and the Center for International Security Studies' Biological Research Security System. The document also recommended the aforementioned as potential resources for countries to develop their own policies and procedures for DURC.

=== European Union ===
The European Academies Science Advisory Council has formed a working group to examine the issues raised by gain-of-function research and to make recommendations for the management of such research and its outputs. The possibility for developing common approaches between the United States and Europe has been explored.

In May 2014, the German National Ethics Council presented a report to the Bundestag on proposed guidance for governance of GoFR. The report called for national legislation on DURC. As of May 2021, the German government has not passed the endorsed legislation. The NEC also proposed a national code-of-conduct for researchers to consent, endorsing which experiments qualify as misconduct and which do not, based on founding principles of public benefit. The German Research Foundation and German National Academy of Sciences made a joint suggestion to expand the role of existing research ethics committees to also evaluate proposals of DURC.

=== United States ===
==== Gain-of-function research moratorium (2014-2017) ====
From 2014 to 2017, the White House Office of Science and Technology Policy and the Department of Health and Human Services instituted a gain-of-function research moratorium and funding pause on research intended to create "dual-use" modified pathogens (related to influenza, MERS, and SARS) while the regulatory environment and review process were reconsidered and overhauled. Under the moratorium, any laboratory who conducted such research would put their future funding (for any project, not just the indicated pathogens) in jeopardy. The NIH has said 18 studies were affected by the moratorium.

The moratorium was a response to laboratory biosecurity incidents that occurred in 2014, including not properly inactivating anthrax samples, the discovery of unlogged smallpox samples, and injecting a chicken with the wrong strain of influenza. These incidents were not related to gain-of-function research. One of the goals of the moratorium was to reduce the handling of dangerous pathogens by all laboratories until safety procedures were evaluated and improved.

Subsequently, symposia and expert panels were convened by the National Science Advisory Board for Biosecurity (NSABB) and National Research Council (NRC). In May 2016, the NSABB published "Recommendations for the Evaluation and Oversight of Proposed Gain-of-Function Research". On 9 January 2017, the HHS published the "Recommended Policy Guidance for Departmental Development of Review Mechanisms for Potential Pandemic Pathogen Care and Oversight" (P3CO). This report sets out how "pandemic potential pathogens" should be regulated, funded, stored, and researched to minimize threats to public health and safety.

On 19 December 2017, the NIH lifted the moratorium because gain-of-function research was deemed "important in helping us identify, understand, and develop strategies and effective countermeasures against rapidly evolving pathogens that pose a threat to public health."

== COVID-19 pandemic ==
During the COVID-19 pandemic a number of conspiracy theories emerged about the origin of the SARS-CoV-2 virus and links to gain-of-function research. In January 2021, University of Saskatchewan virologist Angela Rasmussen wrote that one version of the information invoked previous gain-of-function work on coronaviruses to promulgate the idea that the virus was of laboratory origin. Rasmussen stated that this was unlikely, due to the intense scrutiny and government oversight to which GoFR is subject, and it is improbable that research on hard-to-obtain coronaviruses could occur under the radar.

In a congressional hearing on May 11, 2021, about Anthony Fauci's role as the Chief Medical Advisor to the United States Office of the President, senator Rand Paul stated that "the U.S. has been collaborating with Shi Zhengli of the Wuhan Virology Institute, sharing discoveries about how to create super viruses. This gain-of-function research has been funded by the NIH." Fauci responded "with all due respect, you are entirely and completely incorrect...the NIH has not ever and does not now fund gain-of-function research [conducted at] the Wuhan Institute of Virology." The Washington Post fact-checking team later rated Paul's statements as containing "significant omissions and/or exaggerations". NIH funding to the EcoHealth Alliance and later sub-contracted to the Wuhan Institute of Virology was not to support gain-of-function experiments, but instead to enable the collection of bat samples in the wild. EcoHealth Alliance spokesperson Robert Kessler has also categorically denied the accusation.

The Washington Post also quoted Rutgers University biosecurity expert Richard Ebright's dissenting opinion about Fauci's testimony, demonstrating that there is disagreement about what qualifies as "gain of function" research. Ebright asserted that experiments conducted under the EcoHealth grant "met the definition for gain-of-function research of concern under the 2014 Pause." MIT molecular biologist Alina Chan has argued that these experiments would not have been affected by the 2014 moratorium, because the experiments involved "naturally-occurring viruses" adding that the moratorium had "no teeth".

Several scientists have criticized the US government's GoFR regulations as having serious shortcomings (especially with regard to the NIH's funding of the EcoHealth Alliance grant proposal). Ebright has remarked that the process is not applied to all the experiments covered by the government's policies, while virologists David Relman and Angela Rasmussen have cited a worrying lack of transparency from oversight panels.

== See also ==
- Biotechnology risk
- Directed evolution
- Dual-use technology
- Global Virome Project
