= Origin tracing =

Epidemiology

Tracing the origins of novel viruses and the specific pathways by which they enter the population is based on epidemiological, genomic, virological and clinical studies. This requires that key stakeholders, such as researchers and health workers on the ground pass data to international agencies such as the WHO or the MSF, as free of restrictions as possible, within the constraints of medical privacy laws.

John Snow traced the origins of 1854 Broad Street cholera outbreak to a contaminated water pump, heralding the advent of epidemiology. However, after the pandemic subsided Snow's findings were rejected by government officials causing a political controversy.

In an interview with Discover Magazine, Ian Lipkin said of virus hunting "Initially the evidence is circumstantial", likening it to criminology where a motive and opportunity need to be established.

== See also ==
- Emerging infectious disease
- Scientific Advisory Group for Origins of Novel Pathogens
- WHO Hub for Pandemic and Epidemic Intelligence
