= Global Viral =

Global Viral (GV), previously known as Global Viral Forecasting Institute (GVFI), is a 501(c)(3) not-for-profit organization based in San Francisco, California. It was founded in 2007 by Nathan Wolfe to study infectious diseases, their transmission between animals and humans, and the risk involved with their global spread. An original goal of the organization was to develop an early warning system for pandemics and at one point Global Viral coordinated a staff of over 100 scientists in China, Cameroon, Equatorial Guinea, DR Congo, Republic of the Congo, Laos, Gabon, Central African Republic, Malaysia, Madagascar and Sao Tome.

However, as of 2019 the organization has "shifted" these areas of research to Metabiota, GV's for-profit sister company that focuses on risk analysis of pandemics.

== History ==
The Global Viral Forecasting Institute was founded in 2007 by Nathan Wolfe, receiving seed funding in 2008 from Google and the Skoll Foundation.

== Funding ==
Global Viral has received funding from the Armed Forces Health Surveillance Center (AFHSC), Fogarty International Center, Google, Henry M. Jackson Foundation for the Advancement of Military Medicine (HJF), National Geographic Society, the National Institutes of Health (NIH), Naval Health Research Center (NHRC), Skoll Foundation, United States Agency for International Development (USAID), United States Department of Defense, Wellcome Trust and the W. W. Smith Charitable Trust.
