= Global Virome Project =

The Global Virome Project (GVP) is an American-led international collaborative research initiative based at the One Health Institute at the University of California, Davis. The project was co-launched by EcoHealth Alliance president Peter Daszak, Nathan Wolfe and Edward Rubin of Metabiota, and former Chinese Center for Disease Control and Prevention director George F. Gao.

The goal of the Global Virome Project (GVP) is to identify and prevent future virus outbreaks. The GVP is centered on the massive collection and sequencing of the planet's unknown viruses, with an estimated 1.6 million viral species yet to be discovered in mammal and bird populations. Of these, 631,000 to 827,000 have zoonotic potential. The cost of identifying these unidentified viruses is a major limitation of the GVP, with a total cost estimate of $1.2 billion. That being said, advocates argue that preventing an outbreak is still less costly than reacting to one, with the total cost of the ongoing COVID-19 pandemic estimated at more than $16 trillion. The Global Virome project also aims to boost infectious disease surveillance around the globe by using low cost sequencing methods in high risk countries to prevent disease outbreaks by expanding on the efforts of the USAID (agency for international development) EPT (Emerging Pandemic Threats) PREDICT project. The PREDICT project was founded to discover unidentified viral species by sampling animals and humans in countries with high zoonotic disease threat and determining the mechanisms that cause viral spillover into human populations. The Predict project found over 1000 unique viruses in animals and humans.

The Global Virome Project could aid in pandemic surveillance, diagnosis techniques and prevention strategies, and determine the need for pre-emptive production of vaccine and other countermeasures for candidate high-risk viruses. The GVP can also provide further insights into viral pathogenicity and possible biosecurity methods in agriculture.

The Global Virome Project was supposed to begin sampling wild animal populations in 2020 but was delayed due to the COVID-19 pandemic.
