= Biotechnology risk =

Existential threat from biological sources

Biotechnology risk is a form of existential risk from biological sources, such as genetically engineered biological agents. The release of such high-consequence pathogens could be

- deliberate (in the form of bioterrorism or biological weapons)
- accidental, or
- a naturally occurring event.

A chapter on biotechnology and biosecurity was included in Nick Bostrom's 2008 anthology Global Catastrophic Risks, which covered risks including viral agents. Since then, new technologies like CRISPR and gene drives have been introduced.

While the ability to deliberately engineer pathogens has been constrained to high-end labs run by top researchers, the technology to achieve this is rapidly becoming cheaper and more widespread. For example, the diminishing cost of sequencing the human genome (from $10 million to $1,000), the accumulation of large datasets of genetic information, the discovery of gene drives, and the discovery of CRISPR. Biotechnology risk is therefore a credible explanation for the Fermi paradox.

== GMOs ==
Genetically modified organisms (GMOs), particularly GM foods, are involved in a series of controversies regarding their risks to health and the environment. There is also a risk that organisms could be genetically modified and used as biological weapons.

=== Health risks of GM food ===
==== Unexpected gene interactions ====
The expected outcomes of a transferred gene construct may differ due to gene interactions. It has been hypothesized that genetic modification can potentially cause unintended changes in metabolism. However, compared with traditionally bred crops, GMOs are considerably less genetically disruptive, as they typically involve precise alterations in only a small number of genes.

==== Allergenic potential ====
The allergenic potential of GMOs refers to their capacity to elicit an allergic reaction in already sensitized consumers. Regulatory authorities require that new genetically modified foods be tested for allergenicity before they are marketed, and to date there is no evidence that any genetically modified food is more allergenic than its conventional equivalent. Nevertheless, some researchers emphasize the risk that newly expressed proteins could sensitize populations and become new allergens. To assess this, digestibility tests are employed, taking into account the non-absolute relationship between a protein's stability in the gastrointestinal tract and its likelihood of triggering immune system sensitization. The risk of novel proteins sensitizing populations is not exclusive to genetic engineering, conventional plant breeding, which is often far more genetically disruptive, carries the same potential risk, yet is subject to considerably less scrutiny in this regard.

==== Antibiotic resistance ====
One risk associated with GMOs is the possibility of horizontal gene transfer (HGT) of antibiotic resistance genes. During the genetic modification process, antibiotic resistance genes are commonly used as genetic markers to identify which cells have been successfully modified. The concern is that these marker genes could be horizontally transferred to bacteria present in the human gastrointestinal tract or in the environment, conferring resistance to specific antibiotics. However, the transfer of genes from plants to bacteria is extremely rare due to the specific conditions and mechanisms required for gene transfer, incorporation, and transmission in bacteria. Furthermore, antibiotic resistance genes occur naturally in bacterial populations, and the genes used as markers typically confer resistance to antibiotics that are not widely prescribed.

=== Research ===
Pathogens may be intentionally or unintentionally genetically modified to change their characteristics, including virulence or toxicity. When intentional, these mutations can serve to adapt the pathogen to a laboratory setting, understand the mechanism of transmission or pathogenesis, or in the development of therapeutics. Such mutations have also been used in the development of biological weapons, and dual-use risk continues to be a concern in the research of pathogens. The greatest concern is frequently associated with gain-of-function mutations, which confer novel or increased functionality, and the risk of their release. Gain-of-function research on viruses has been occurring since the 1970s, and came to notoriety after influenza vaccines were serially passed through animal hosts.

==== Mousepox ====
A group of Australian researchers unintentionally changed characteristics of the mousepox virus while trying to develop a virus to sterilize rodents as a means of biological pest control. The modified virus became highly lethal even in vaccinated and naturally resistant mice.

==== Influenza ====
In 2011, two laboratories published reports of mutational screens of avian influenza viruses, identifying variants which become transmissible through the air between ferrets. These viruses seem to overcome an obstacle which limits the global impact of natural H5N1. In 2012, scientists further screened point mutations of the H5N1 virus genome to identify mutations which allowed airborne spread. While the stated goal of this research was to improve surveillance and prepare for influenza viruses which are of particular risk in causing a pandemic, there was significant concern that the laboratory strains themselves could escape. Marc Lipsitch and Alison P. Galvani coauthored a paper in PLoS Medicine arguing that experiments in which scientists manipulate bird influenza viruses to make them transmissible in mammals deserve more intense scrutiny as to whether or not their risks outweigh their benefits. Lipsitch also described influenza as the most frightening "potential pandemic pathogen".

=== Regulation ===
In 2014, the United States instituted a moratorium on gain-of-function research into influenza, MERS, and SARS. This was in response to the particular risks these airborne pathogens pose. However, many scientists opposed the moratorium, arguing that this limited their ability to develop antiviral therapies. The scientists argued gain-of-function mutations were necessary, such as adapting MERS to laboratory mice so it could be studied.

The National Science Advisory Board for Biosecurity also has instituted rules for research proposals using gain-of-function research of concern. The rules outline how experiments are to be evaluated for risks, safety measures, and potential benefits; prior to funding.

In order to limit access to minimize the risk of easy access to genetic material from pathogens, including viruses, the members of the International Gene Synthesis Consortium screen orders for regulated pathogen and other dangerous sequences. Orders for pathogenic or dangerous DNA are verified for customer identity, barring customers on governmental watch lists, and only to institutions "demonstrably engaged in legitimate research".

== CRISPR ==
Following surprisingly fast advances in CRISPR editing, an international summit proclaimed in December 2015 that it was "irresponsible" to proceed with human gene editing until issues in safety and efficacy were addressed. One way in which CRISPR editing can cause existential risk is through gene drives, which are said to have potential to "revolutionize" ecosystem management. Gene drives are a novel technology that have potential to make genes spread through wild populations extremely quickly. They have the potential to rapidly spread resistance genes against malaria in order to rebuff the malaria parasite Plasmodium falciparum. These gene drives were originally engineered in January 2015 by Ethan Bier and Valentino Gantz; this editing was spurred by the discovery of CRISPR-Cas9. In late 2015, DARPA started to study approaches that could halt gene drives if they went out of control and threatened biological species.

== See also ==
- Global catastrophic risk
- Human extinction
- Biological warfare
