= Silja Vöneky =

German jurist (born 1969)

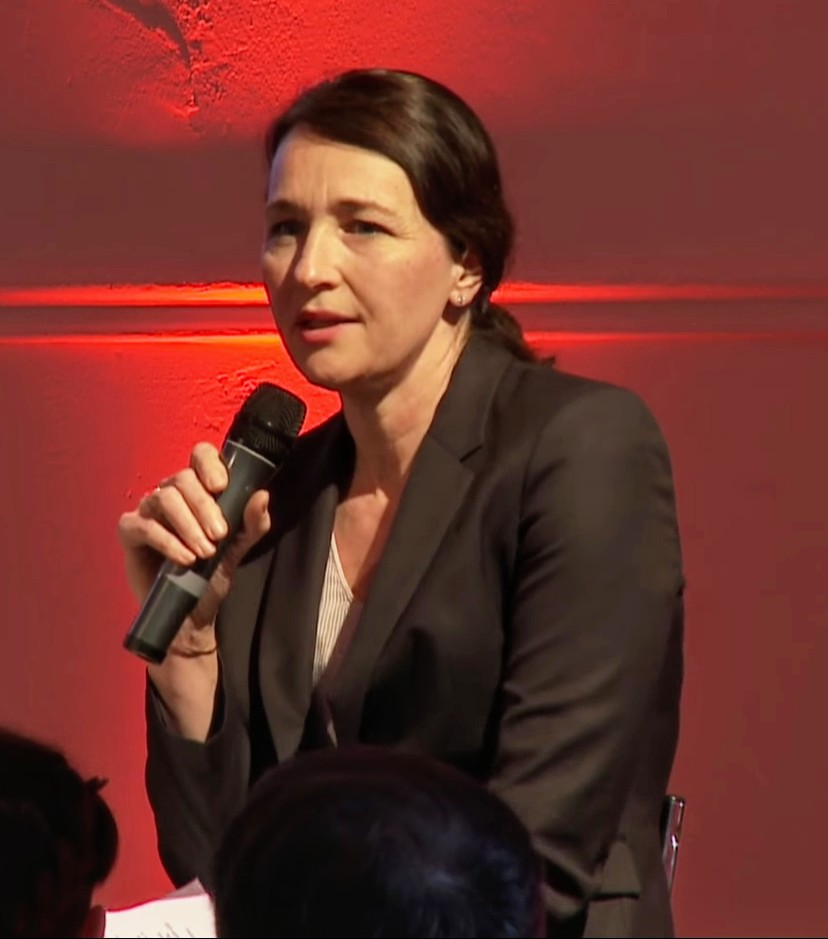
- Born: 3 September 1969 (age 57)
- Education: University of Heidelberg
- Scientific career
- Fields: Ethics of Law, Public Law, International Law
- Workplaces: University of Freiburg
- Doctoral advisor: Rüdiger Wolfrum
- Website: http://www.jura.uni-freiburg.de/institute/ioeffr2/silja-voeneky-en?set_language=en

Silja Vöneky (born September 3, 1969) is a German jurist, specializing in international law and philosophy of law. She is a professor of public international law, comparative law, and ethics of law at the University of Freiburg.

== Life ==
She studied law and philosophy of law at the University of Freiburg, the University of Bonn, the University of Edinburgh, and the University of Heidelberg, completing her judicial clerkship (Referendariat) at the Kammergericht in Berlin. Thereafter, Vöneky wrote her doctoral dissertation on environmental protection in armed conflicts at the Max Planck Institute for Comparative Public Law and International Law in Heidelberg under Rüdiger Wolfrum. There she was head of the independent Max Planck research group on the "Democratic Legitimacy of Ethical Decisions". In the framework of this research, she coined the concept 'ethicalization of the law'. In 2009, she completed her habilitation at the University of Heidelberg with a thesis on law, morality, ethics, and issues of democratic legitimation.

In 2012, she was appointed to a four-year term as a member of the German Ethics Council on the proposal of the German Federal Government and was head of the Council's working group on biosecurity, which – at the request of the German Federal Ministries of Research and of Health – issued a report on the freedom and responsibility of research with respect to biosecurity that attracted international interest. In addition, she is a founding member of the Cambridge Working Group.

Since 2001, Silja Vöneky has been a legal advisor to the German Federal Foreign Office concerning the Arctic and Antarctic, and a member of the German Delegation to the ATCMs (Antarctic Treaty Consultative Meetings). She also prepared the German Draft Law for the Implementation of the Liability Annex to the Protocol on Environmental Protection to the Antarctic Treaty for the German Ministry of Environment. In the 2015-2016 academic year, Silja Vöneky was a visiting fellow at the Human Rights Programme at Harvard Law School and conducted research on the topic "Human Rights and Governance of Existential Risks" in connection with "Human Rights, Legitimacy, and Democracy in the 21st Century". Silja Vöneky continued her work on questions of risk governance on the basis of international law during the winter semester of 2018 for one year as a fellow of the 2018-2019 FRIAS Research Group on Responsible Artificial Intelligence (Emerging ethical, legal, philosophical and social aspects of the interaction between humans and autonomous intelligent systems). On 18 July 2024, Vöneky was elected by the Landtag of Baden-Württemberg, with 124 of 141 votes, to serve as a judge on the Constitutional Court of the State of Baden-Württemberg.

== Representative writings in English ==
- Security Interests, Human Rights, and Espionage in the Second Machine Age – NSA Mass Surveillance and the Framework of Public International Law, FIP 3/2015.
- Biosecurity – Freedom, Responsibility, and Legitimacy of Research, in Ordnung der Wissenschaft 2/2015, available at: http://www.ordnungderwissenschaft.de/
- Foundations and Limits of an Ethicalization of Law, in F. Battaglia, N. Mukerji, J. Nida-Rümelin (eds.), Rethinking Responsibility in Science and Technology, 2014, pp. 183–202
- Implementation and Enforcement of International Humanitarian Law, Chapter 14, in D. Fleck (ed.), The Handbook of International Humanitarian Law, 3. Edition, 2013, pp. 647–700
- Francis Lieber (1798-1872), in B. Fassbender, A. Peters, S. Peter (eds.), The Oxford Handbook of the History of International Law, 2012, pp. 1137–1141
- The Fight against Terrorism and the Rules of International Law - Comment on Papers and Speeches of John B. Bellinger, Chief Legal Advisor to the United States Department, in R. A. Miller (ed.), Comparative Law as Transnational Law, A Decade of the German Law Journal, Oxford 2012, pp. 353–362.
- Analogy in International Law, in R. Wolfrum (ed.), Max Planck Encyclopedia of Public International Law, Vol. I, 2012, pp. 374–380, available at: http://www.mpepil.com
- Antarctica, in R. Wolfrum (ed.), Max Planck Encyclopedia of Public International Law, Vol. I, 2012, pp. 418–435 (together with S. Addison-Agyei), available at: http://www.mpepil.com
- Environment, Protection in Armed Conflict, in R. Wolfrum (ed.), Max Planck Encyclopedia of Public International Law, Vol. III, 2012, pp. 509–518 (together with R. Wolfrum), available at: http://www.mpepil.com
- The Liability Annex to the Protocol on Environmental Protection to the Antarctic Treaty, in D. König/ P.-T. Stoll/ V. Röben/ N. Matz-Lück (eds.), International Law Today: New Challenges and the Need for Reform?, Heidelberg 2008, pp. 165–197.
