= National Avian Influenza Reference Laboratory =

The National Avian Influenza Reference Laboratory (NAIRL) is a BSL3 facility in Harbin, China.

== Leadership ==
- Hualan Chen

== History ==
In October 2019, scientists at the NAIRL reported on the development of a real-time RT-PCR test for the H5N6 virus.

On 2 February 2021, the NAIRL reported an outbreak in Yuanmingyuan Ruins Park, Haidian District, Beijing of a highly pathogenic H5N8 variant, which had a mortality rate of 1 in 5 Cygnus atratus (Anatidae) animals.
