= Independent Panel for Pandemic Preparedness and Response =

The Independent Panel for Pandemic Preparedness and Response was established by the Director-General of the World Health Organization in response to a resolution adopted in the 73rd World Health Assembly at the onset of COVID-19 pandemic. Its mission is to "provide an evidence-based path for the future", and is led by Co-Chairs Ellen Johnson Sirleaf, the former President of Liberia and Helen Clark, the former Prime Minister of New Zealand.

== 2021 report ==
In May 2021, the panel presented its findings and recommendations to curb the ongoing COVID-19 pandemic and prevent future pandemics. The report called the existing system "unfit for purpose", calling for a pandemic treaty that establishes legal obligations for WHO member states and international organizations during pandemics. The report also called for the panel to have legal powers to "hold actors accountable", and recommended for a "Global Health Threats Council" to be formed and led by heads of state, sitting above the WHO in the United Nations.

== See also ==
- Scientific Advisory Group for Origins of Novel Pathogens
- WHO Hub for Pandemic and Epidemic Intelligence
- WHO Pandemic Agreement
