= Nita Madhav =

Epidemiologist

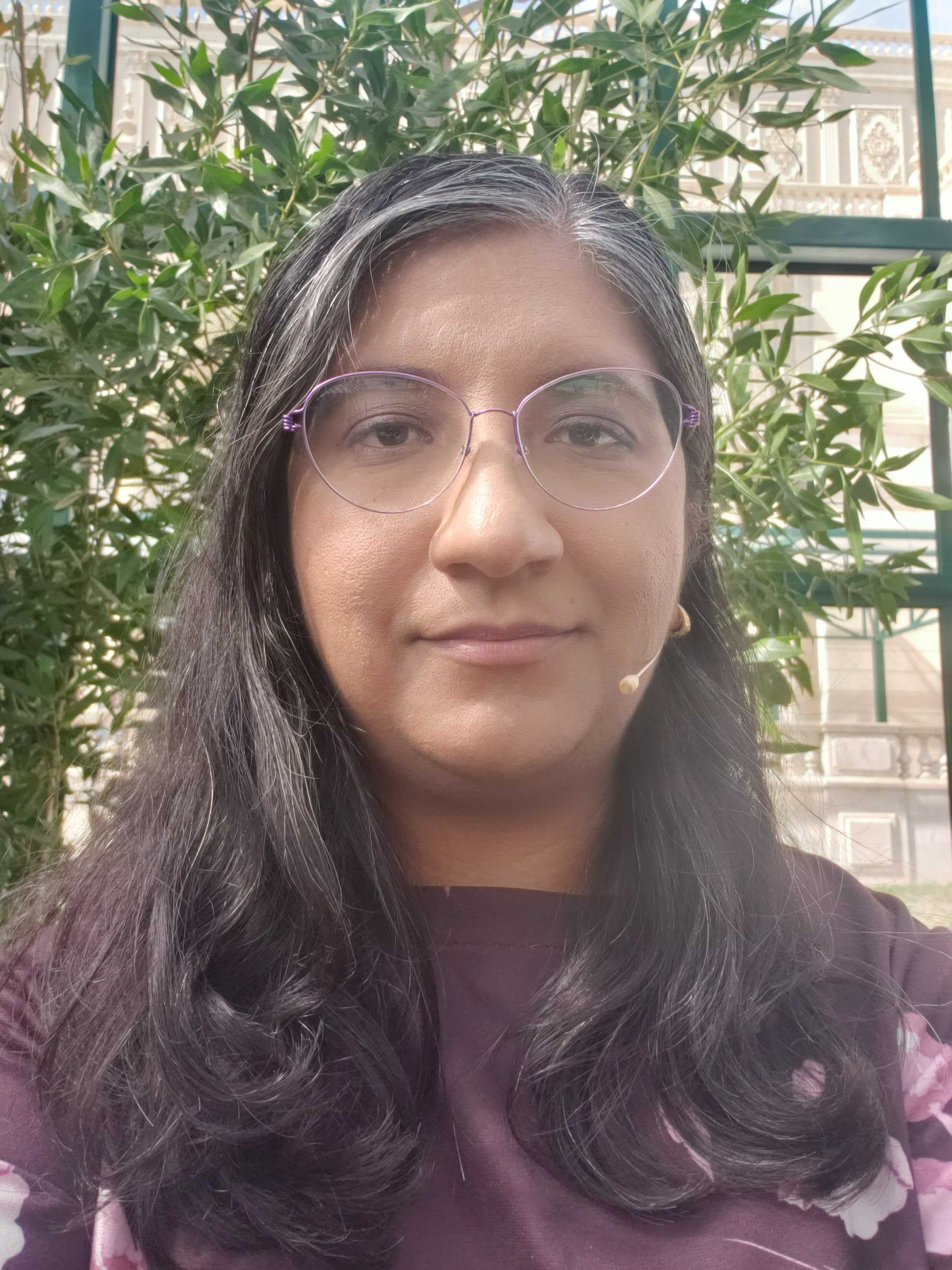
- Madhav in 2022
- Born: Michigan, USA
- Education: Yale, Emory
- Scientific career
- Fields: Epidemiology, Risk Modeling

Nita Madhav is an epidemiologist and risk modeler who is Senior Director at Ginkgo Biosecurity and was CEO of Metabiota from 2019 - 2022.

== Education ==
Madhav graduated from Yale University in 2002 with degrees in ecology and evolutionary biology, and received her Master's in Public health from Emory University in 2005.

== Career ==
After time at the Centers for Disease Control and Prevention and AIR Worldwide, Madhav joined Metabiota to work on infectious disease modeling and data science. During the ensuing five years, Madhav's team worked on models to predict epidemiological preparedness and readiness of economies to absorb losses experienced in these extreme, "Black swan theory" events. These models were formalized into the Epidemic Preparedness Index.

Along with colleagues from Stanford and Metabiota, Madhav co-authored a chapter on pandemic preparedness for the World Bank.

She was promoted to CEO in 2019.

In 2020, Madhav remarked that Metabiota's AI-powered models were capable of forecasting epidemics based on both formal and informal data sources.
