= Simon Wain-Hobson =

British–French microbiologist (born 1953)

Simon Wain-Hobson OBE (born 25 May 1953) is a British/French microbiologist, professor of molecular retrovirology at the Pasteur Institute in Paris, director of the French National HPV Reference Laboratory, and board chairman of the Foundation for Vaccine Research in Washington, D.C.

== Career ==
Wain-Hobson obtained a PhD in biochemistry from the University of Oxford in 1977, served as a post-doctoral fellow at the Weizmann Institute of Science from 1977 to 1980, and thereafter moved to the Pasteur Institute in Paris. Wain-Hobson and his research group at the Pasteur Institute were the first to publish the sequence of HIV, which was also the first full sequence of a primate lentivirus. Wain-Hobson is holder of licensed patents on HIV genomes and diagnostics.

Wain-Hobson's most recent work involves the role of APOBEC3 in cancer and other human diseases. Wain-Hobson is a co-founder of Invectys Inc., a biopharmaceutical company focused on the development of immunotherapy approaches to the treatment of cancer.

Wain-Hobson won the André Lwoff prize in 1996 and Athena prize from the French Academy of Sciences in 2007 and is Officier de la Légion d’Honneur.

Wain-Hobson was appointed Officer of the Order of the British Empire (OBE) in the 2022 New Year Honours for services to virology.

In 1999, Wain-Hobson engaged with a controversial hypothesis that the oral polio vaccine in Africa may have been the source of HIV in humans, and suggested it had some plausibility. By 2001, Wain-Hobson had co-authored a study examining a sample of the vaccine, which contradicted the hypothesis, and wrote "Those of us who were formerly willing to give some credence to the OPV hypothesis will now consider that the matter has been laid to rest".
