= National Science Advisory Board for Biosecurity =

- Abbreviation: NSABB
- Location: United States
- Members: Jason Boehm (Department of Commerce); David Christian Hassell (Department of Defense); Sharlene Weatherwax (Department of Energy); Anthony S. Fauci (Department of Health and Human Services); Sally Phillips (Department of Health and Human Services); CAPT Carmen Maher (Department of Health and Human Services); Michael W. Shaw(Department of Health and Human Services)

The National Science Advisory Board for Biosecurity (NSABB) is a panel of experts that reports to the Secretary of the United States Department of Health and Human Services. It is tasked with recommending policies on such questions as how to prevent published research in biotechnology from aiding terrorism, without slowing scientific progress.

The NSABB is a federal advisory committee that addresses issues related to biosecurity and dual use research at the request of the United States Government. The NSABB has up to 25 voting members with a broad range of expertise including molecular biology, microbiology, infectious diseases, biosafety, public health, veterinary medicine, plant health, national security, biodefense, law enforcement, scientific publishing, and other related fields.

== History ==
In May 2016, the NSABB published "RECOMMENDATIONS FOR THE EVALUATION AND OVERSIGHT OF PROPOSED GAIN-OF-FUNCTION RESEARCH".

== Publications ==
The NSABB had published 11 reports as of February 2021. The first report on the list was released in December 2006.

== Composition ==
The NSABB is composed of non-voting ex officio and appointed voting members. As of 2021, the Chair of the NSABB was Gerald W. Parker, Jr., DVM, PhD.

As of 2017, the ex officio members were:

- Department of Commerce:
  - Jason Boehm, Ph.D., Office of Program Analysis and Evaluation, National Institute of Standards and Technology Division Head
- Department of Defense :
  - David Christian Hassell, Ph.D., Deputy Assistant Secretary of Defense for Nuclear and Chemical and Biological Programs
- Department of Energy:
  - Sharlene Weatherwax, Ph.D., Associate Director of Science for Biological and Environmental Research
- Department of Health and Human Services
  - Anthony S. Fauci, M.D., Director, National Institute of Allergy & Infectious Disease
  - Sally Phillips, R.N., Ph.D., Deputy Assistant Secretary, Office of Policy and Planning, Office of the Assistant Secretary for Preparedness and Response
  - CAPT Carmen Maher, Deputy Director, Office of Counterterrorism and Emerging Threats (OCET), Office of the Commissioner, Food and Drug Administration
  - Michael W. Shaw, Ph.D., Senior Advisor for Laboratory Science, Office of Infectious Diseases, Centers for Disease Control and Prevention
- Department of Homeland Security
  - Wendy Hall, Ph.D., Special Senior Advisor for Biological Threats, Office of Chemical, Biological, and Nuclear Policy
- Department of the Interior
  - Anne E. Kinsinger, Associate Director for Biology, U.S. Geological Survey
- Department of Justice
  - Edward You, Supervisory Special Agent, FBI Weapons of Mass Destruction Directorate
- Department of State
  - Christopher Park, Director, Biological Policy Staff, Bureau of International Security and Nonproliferation
- Department of Veterans Affairs
  - Brenda A. Cuccherini, Ph.D., M.P.H. Special Assistant to the Chief Research and Development Officer, Veterans Health Administration
- Environmental Protection Agency,
  - Gregory Sayles, Ph.D., Acting Director, National Homeland Security Research Center
- Executive Office of the President
  - Gerald Epstein, Ph.D., Assistant Director for Biosecurity and Emerging Technologies, National Security and International Affairs Division, Office of Science and Technology Policy
- Intelligence Community
  - Amanda Dion-Schultz, Ph.D., Office of the Chief Scientist
  - Robert M. Miceli, Ph.D., Biological Issue Manager and Advisor to the Director, Office of the Director of National Intelligence
- National Aeronautics and Space Administration
  - David R. Liskowsky, Ph.D., Director, Medical Policy & Ethics, Office of the Chief Health and Medical Officer
- Department of Agriculture
  - Steven Kappes, Ph.D. Deputy Administrator, Animal Production and Protection
