= WHO Pandemic Agreement =

International agreement

- Condition: 60 ratifications
- Depositary: Secretary-General of the United Nations
- Languages: Arabic; Chinese; English; French; Russian; Spanish

The WHO Pandemic Agreement (WHOPA) is an international agreement aimed at improving global coordination for pandemic prevention, preparedness and response.

== History ==
On 9 July 2020 Director-General Tedros Adhanom Ghebreyesus of the World Health Organization (WHO) established the Independent Panel for Pandemic Preparedness and Response. Beginning in September 2020, the Panel examined why COVID-19 became a global health and socio-economic crisis. The Panel published its findings in its report, COVID-19: Make it the Last Pandemic, in May 2021. Amongst several recommendations, the report called for a "Pandemic Treaty".

On 29 August 2024, Republican governors of 26 US states issued a joint statement that they would not comply with the treaty.

On 20 May 2025 at the World Health Assembly (WHA), 124 members of the WHO adopted WHOPA, while 11 countries, including Poland, Israel, Italy, Russia, Slovakia and Iran, abstained. The United States was in the process of withdrawing from the WHA and declined to participate in the vote, and the Secretary of Health and Human Services, Robert F. Kennedy Jr., criticized the proceedings in a televised address to the Assembly.

An annex on the sharing of pathogenic information still remains to be finalized before the Agreement can be opened for signatures and enter into force.

== Contents ==
The Agreement explicitly rules out the WHO holding "any authority to direct, order, alter or otherwise prescribe" any policy, or to "impose any requirements that parties take specific actions".

The Agreement refers to the WHO as "directing and co-ordinating authority" in the event of a pandemic, as does the constitution of the WHO.

== See also ==
- Pandemic Influenza Preparedness Framework
