= WHO Hub for Pandemic and Epidemic Intelligence =

World Health Organization Hub

The WHO Hub for Pandemic and Epidemic Intelligence was established by the Director-General of the World Health Organization and Chancellor of Germany in 2021 in response to the COVID-19 pandemic.

== See also ==
- Scientific Advisory Group for Origins of Novel Pathogens
- Independent Panel for Pandemic Preparedness and Response
