= Chen Hualan =

Chinese animal virologist

- 陈化兰
- Born: March 1969 (age 57); Jingyuan County, Gansu, China
- Education: Gansu Agricultural University; Graduate School of Chinese Academy of Agricultural Sciences
- Children: 1
- Awards: L'Oréal-UNESCO Awards for Women in Science (2016)
- Scientific career
- Fields: Animal virology
- Workplaces: Chinese Academy of Agricultural Sciences

Chen Hualan (simplified Chinese: 陈化兰; traditional Chinese: 陳化蘭; pinyin: Chén Huàlán; born March 1969) is a Chinese veterinary virologist best known for researching animal epidemic diseases. She is a member of the World Organisation for Animal Health (OIE) and a member of the Food and Agriculture Organization Corporate Statistical Database (FAOSTAT). She is now a researcher and PhD Supervisor at Harbin Veterinary Research Institute of Chinese Academy of Agricultural Sciences.

She has been listed among the "Ten Scientific Figures of the Year" by Nature in 2013. She won the L'Oréal-UNESCO Awards for Women in Science in 2016, and was elected to the Chinese Academy of Sciences in 2017.

== Awards ==
- First Class National Science and Technology Progress Award
- Second Class National Technology Invention Award
- Chinese Agricultural Elites Award
- China Youth Science and Technology Award
- China Young Female Scientists Award (2011)
- National "May 1" Labor Medal
- China Youth "May 4" Medal
- L'Oréal-UNESCO Awards for Women in Science
- Asian Scientist 100, Asian Scientist, 2017
