= Edward Rubin =

American geneticist

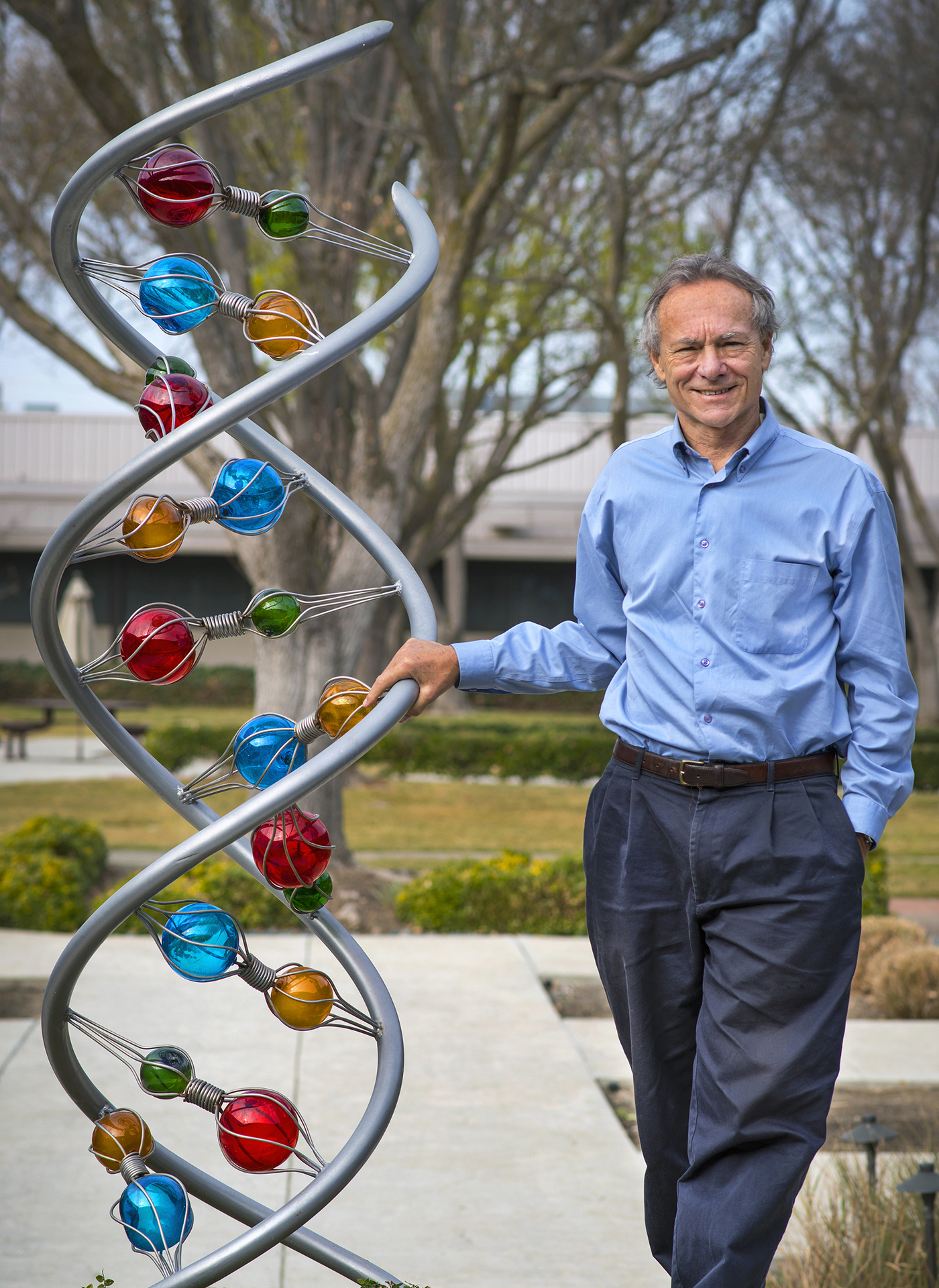

Edward Rubin is the chief scientific officer at Metabiota, a company that works on epidemic risk and infectious diseases. From 2002 to 2016, he was a researcher at the Lawrence Berkeley National Laboratory and the director of the Department of Energy's Joint Genome Institute. In 2012, he was named the Charles J. and Lois B. Epstein Visiting Professor at the University of California San Francisco.

Rubin performed testing on the Neanderthal genome, which suggests human and Neanderthal DNA are some 99.5 percent to nearly 99.9 percent identical.

He is on the board of directors of the Global Virome Project.
