= Nathan Wolfe =

American virologist (born 1970)

Nathan D. Wolfe
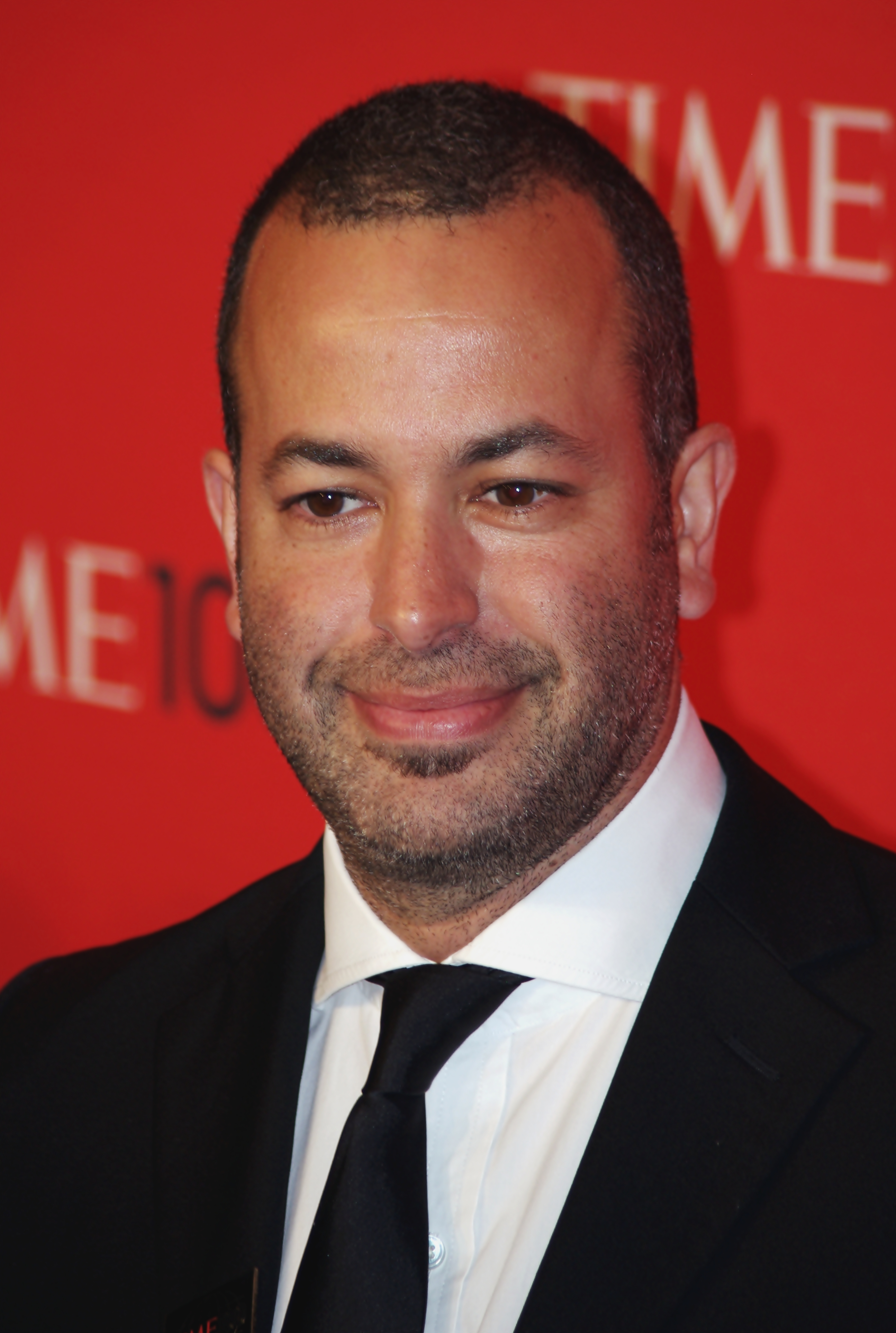
- Wolfe in 2011
- Born: August 24, 1970 (age 56); Detroit, Michigan, U.S.
- Education: Stanford, Harvard
- Scientific career
- Fields: Virology
- Workplaces: Stanford, UCLA

Nathan Daniel Wolfe (born 24 August 1970) is an American virologist. He was the founder (in 2007) and director of Global Viral and the Lorry I. Lokey Visiting Professor in Human Biology at Stanford University.

== Career ==
Wolfe spent over eight years conducting biomedical research in both sub-Saharan Africa and Southeast Asia. He is also the founder of Metabiota, which offers both governmental and corporate services for biological threat evaluation and management. He serves on the editorial board of EcoHealth and Scientific American and is a member of DARPA's Defense Science Research Council. His laboratory was among the first to discover and describe the Simian foamy virus.

In 2008, he warned that the world was not ready for a pandemic.

In 2011, his book The Viral Storm: The Dawn of a New Pandemic Age was short-listed for the Winton Prize.

As reported in a Wired feature in 2020, Wolfe worked with the German insurance firm Munich Re to offer major corporate leaders pandemic policies, which were not purchased; a stark reality during the ensuing COVID-19 pandemic.

== Awards ==
Wolfe has been awarded more than $40 million in funding from a diverse array of sources including the U.S. Department of Defense, Google.org, the National Institutes of Health, the Skoll Foundation, the Bill & Melinda Gates Foundation and the National Geographic Society.

- Fulbright fellowship recipient (1997)
- National Geographic Emerging Explorer (2004)
- NIH Director's Pioneer Award (2005)
- Popular Science: "Brilliant 10" (2006)
- Rolling Stone: "Top 100 Agents of Change" (2009)
- World Economic Forum's Young Global Leaders (2010)

== Association with Jeffrey Epstein ==
In January 2026, the United States Department of Justice released over 3.5 million files related to convicted sex offender Jeffrey Epstein pursuant to the Epstein Transparency Act. Wolfe's name appeared 589 times in the documents.

The files revealed that Wolfe had sought research funding from Epstein for a proposed study exploring possible microbial influences on sexual behavior, which Wolfe referred to in a 2013 email as "our horny virus hypothesis." The Stanford Daily also reported that Wolfe had invited Epstein to a 2010 dinner party, describing attendees as including "a couple of hottie interns." Wolfe acknowledged Epstein in his 2011 book The Viral Storm and continued correspondence with him after Epstein's 2008 guilty plea for soliciting underage sex, including sending wedding invitations and a baby announcement.

In a statement to the Stanford Daily in February 2026, Wolfe denied any wrongdoing and said the research project was never pursued and that he never received funding from Epstein. He stated that he had met Epstein "professionally" at Epstein's homes in New York and Palm Beach but said he "never visited his island or flew on his plane" and "never witnessed or participated in any misconduct or inappropriate behavior." Wolfe acknowledged "overfamiliarity and poor judgment" in his correspondence and expressed regret for his association with Epstein.

== Personal life ==
Wolfe is married to the playwright Lauren Gunderson, they have been separated since October 2025. The pair have two sons. As part of his work, Wolfe has lived in Cameroon, Malaysia and Uganda.
