= Alison P. Galvani =

American epidemiologist

- Born: 1977
- Education: University of Oxford
- Scientific career
- Fields: Epidemiologist
- Workplaces: Yale School of Public Health
- Thesis: The evolutionary epidemiology of antigenic diversity in helminth parasites. (2002)

Alison P. Galvani (born ca. 1977) is an American epidemiologist. She is the Burnett and Stender Families Professor of Epidemiology at the Yale School of Public Health and the Director of the Center for Infectious Disease Modeling and Analysis.

== Early life and education ==
Galvani grew up in Northern California, the daughter of Patrick and Nancy Galvani. She attended a British boarding school beginning at age eleven. When she was five years old, her parents separated, and later that year, in August 1982, her mother was murdered. While Galvani's father was initially arrested and charged, the charges were later dropped by the San Mateo County district attorney's office. Many years later, in December 2025, Patrick Galvani was arrested by the Foster City police and charged again with the murder of his wife.

Galvani became interested in biology after reading Richard Dawkins' The Blind Watchmaker in high school. She wrote Dawkins and he replied, encouraging her to apply to Oxford University. She earned a degree in biological sciences from Oxford and continued her studies there, receiving a PhD in theoretical epidemiology.

== Career ==
The focus of Galvani's research is the application of evolutionary ecology and epidemiology in the study of diseases. She has published over 300 scholarly articles. Galvani directs the Center for Infectious Disease Modeling and Analysis (CIDMA) since 2013. In 2014, she and her team published a series of papers covering the ongoing Ebola virus epidemic in West Africa. She was named the Burnett and Stender Families Professor of Public Health in 2015. She is the youngest faculty member in Yale School of Medicine's history to be appointed to a named professorship. Anthony Fauci, director of the US National Institute of Allergy and Infectious Diseases, described Dr. Galvani as an international star in the field of modelling of infectious diseases and commented on her research contributions as

“She has made major contributions in our understanding of the dynamics and impact of a variety of infectious diseases outbreaks including HIV/AIDS, Zika, Ebola, and influenza, among many others and now most recently COVID-19. It has been a pleasure to have her as an esteemed colleague and friend.”

== Awards and honors ==
- 2005 – Young Investigator Prize (American Society of Naturalists)
- 2006 – John Simon Guggenheim Memorial Foundation Award
- 2007 – MacMillan Award
- 2007 – Institute for Advanced Studies in Berlin fellowship
- 2012 – Blavatnik Awards for Young Scientists
- 2013 – Bellman Prize
