= Metabiota =

Company based in California, US

Metabiota Inc.
- Company type: Independent Business
- Founded: 2008; 18 years ago
- Founder: Nathan Wolfe
- Headquarters: San Francisco, California, United States
- Key people: Nita Madhav (CEO); Edward Rubin (Chief Scientific Officer)
- Number of employees: 51-200
- Website: metabiota.com

Metabiota is a San Francisco startup that compiles data from around the world to predict disease outbreaks. The company is a partner with USAID's PREDICT and PREVENT programs. In the early months of the SARS-CoV-2 outbreak, Metabiota and BlueDot independently demonstrated the capabilities of computer analytics to map the future spread of the virus between countries.

In an effort to expand its business offerings, Metabiota teamed up with insurance groups Marsh, African Risk Capacity and Munich Re to provide data for outbreak coverage. Coverage would pay out to governments or companies based on stages of severity of an outbreak to help pay the cost to respond.

Google invested $1 million into the company while also planning to act as a partner to provide expertise in data analysis. Hunter Biden's Rosemont Seneca Technology Partners was reported to have a 13.4% stake in the company in 2014. This investment and Metabiota's work with Black & Veatch at labs in Ukraine led to the company being flagged in Russia's bioweapons claims during its 2022 invasion of Ukraine.

The company had staff stationed in Kenema supporting the Sierra Leone government when the Western African Ebola virus epidemic began. Médecins Sans Frontières criticized the company for failing to discover early cases, and for not sharing data or contact tracing information. Metabiota responded, saying they were restricted to reporting only to the local government.
