= Marc Lipsitch =

American epidemiologist

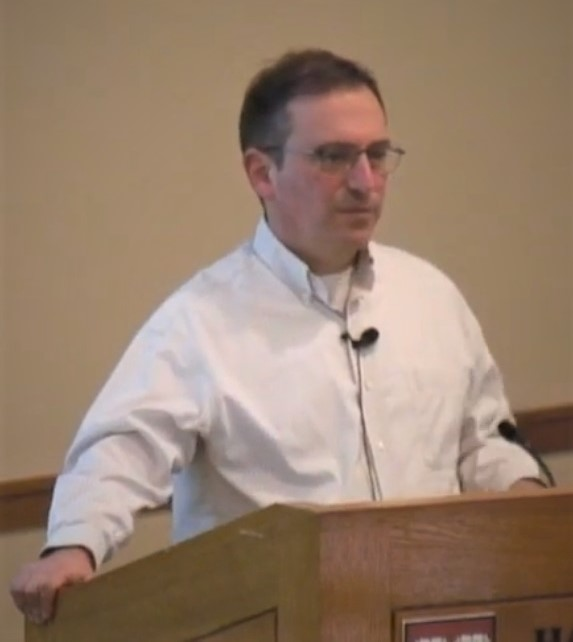
- Lipsitch speaks in 2018
- Born: 1969 (age 56–57)
- Education: Yale University, BA; Oxford University, DPhil, Zoology
- Scientific career
- Fields: Epidemiology
- Institutions: Stanford University; Harvard T.H. Chan School of Public Health; Emory University
- Thesis: Pathogen transmission and the evolution of virulence (1995)
- Doctoral advisors: Martin Nowak; Robert May

Marc Lipsitch (born 1969) is an American epidemiologist and Professor in the Department of Medicine and the Division of Infectious Diseases and Geographic Medicine, at the Stanford University School of Medicine. He has worked on modeling the transmission of Coronavirus disease 2019 (COVID-19).

== Education and early career ==
Lipsitch attended Yale University, where he received his Bachelor of Arts degree in philosophy in 1991. He attended Oxford University as a Rhodes Scholar, studying zoology, and received his Doctor of Philosophy degree in 1995. There, he studied under Robert May and Martin Nowak. He then returned to the United States for his postdoctoral fellowship at Emory University from 1995 to 1999. During that time, he worked at the Centers for Disease Control and Prevention before joining the faculty at Harvard T.H. Chan School of Public Health. In 2026 he joined the faculty of Stanford University where he holds appointments in the Department of Medicine and the Division of Infectious Diseases and Geographic Medicine, at the Stanford University School of Medicine, the Department of Biology in the School of Humanities and Sciences, and as Senior Fellow in the Freeman Spogli Institute for International Studies, affiliated with the Center for International Security and Cooperation (CISAC), where he holds the Michael and Barbara Berberian Professorship.

== Research ==
As an epidemiologist, Lipsitch has focused his research on better understanding the evolution of infectious disease and their effect on humans as well as investigating the triggers and mechanisms for disease immunity. While this research emphasizes the study of specific pathogen characteristics, such as mapping genomic diversity of Streptococcus pneumoniae among different human populations, other research aims include more macro-level concerns such as forecasting disease and assessing pandemic response and preparedness.

At Harvard T.H. Chan School of Public Health, Lipsitch oversees research engaged in improving the mathematical modeling of infectious disease as well as how such information is effectively communicated to policy-makers and their constituents. This work also contributes to that the National Institute of General Medical Sciences, within the National Institutes of Health, as a Models of Infections Disease Agency Study (MIDAS) funded Center of Excellence.

In addition to his work at Harvard, Lipsitch is credited for his work monitoring nationwide trends of pathogens in multiple countries around the globe and currently with the Centers for Disease Control and Prevention’s Active Bacterial Core Surveillance program. In 2009, Lipsitch served as a member of the President’s Council of Advisors on Science and Technology within the H1N1 flu pandemic working group.

== Awards and honors ==
- Elected Fellow, National Academy of Medicine, 2020
- Elected Fellow, American Academy of Microbiology, 2015
- Kenneth Rothman Epidemiology Prize, 2011
- Rhodes Scholarship, 1995
