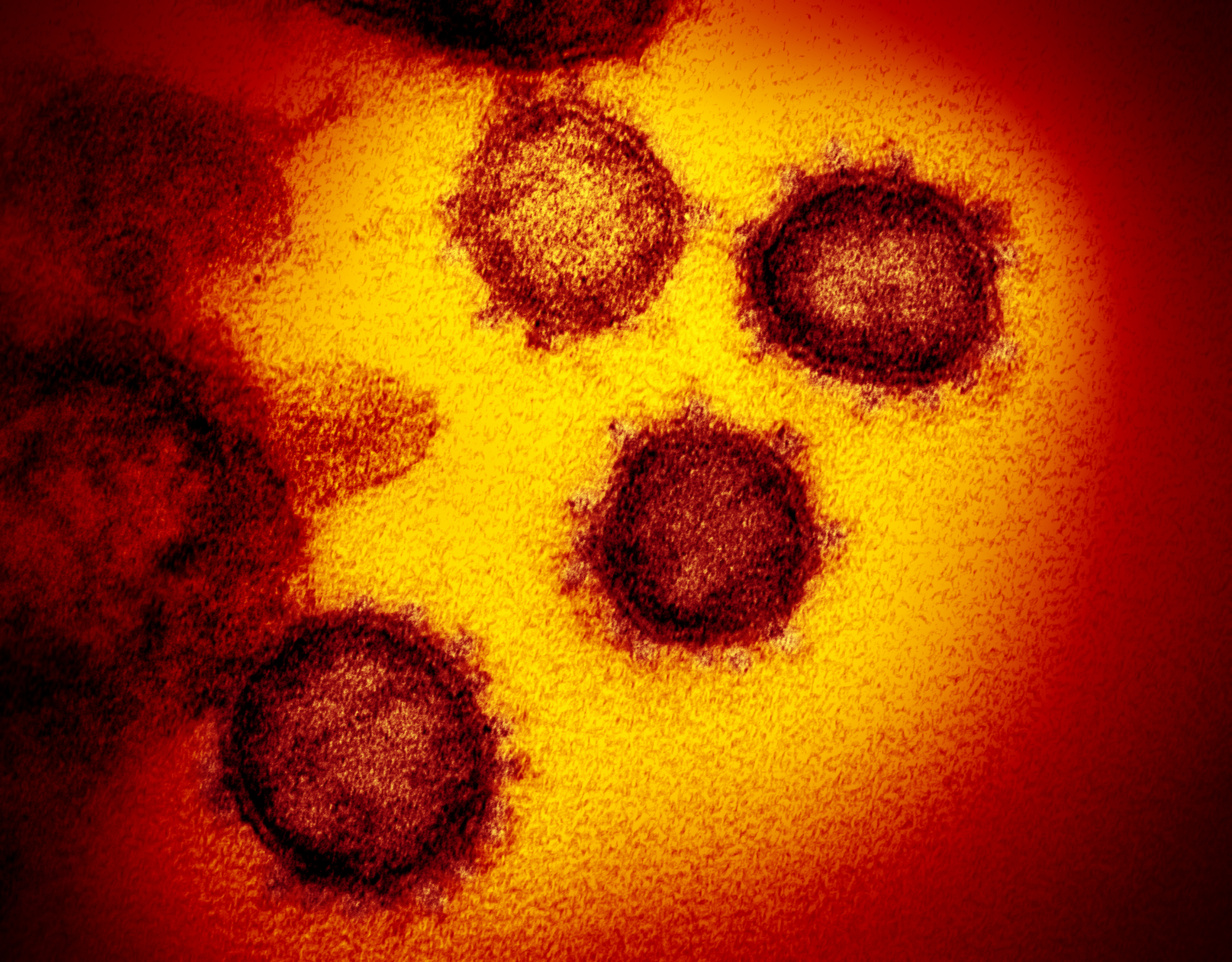
- Transmission electron micrograph of SARS-related coronaviruses emerging from host cells cultured in the lab

Virus classification
- (unranked): Virus
- Realm: Riboviria
- Kingdom: Orthornavirae
- Phylum: Pisuviricota
- Class: Pisoniviricetes
- Order: Nidovirales
- Family: Coronaviridae
- Genus: Betacoronavirus
- Subgenus: Sarbecovirus
- Species: Betacoronavirus pandemicum

Strains
- SARS-CoV-1; SARS-CoV-2; Bat SARS-like coronavirus WIV1; Bat coronavirus RaTG13; Numerous other bat-hosted strains

Synonyms
- SARS coronavirus; SARS-related coronavirus; Severe acute respiratory syndrome coronavirus

= SARS-related coronavirus =

Species of coronavirus causing SARS and COVID-19

Severe acute respiratory syndrome–related coronavirus (SARSr-CoV or SARS-CoV, Betacoronavirus pandemicum) (Note: The terms SARSr-CoV and SARS-CoV are sometimes used interchangeably, especially prior to the discovery of SARS-CoV-2. This may cause confusion when some publications refer to SARS-CoV-1 as SARS-CoV.) is a species of virus consisting of many known strains. Two strains of the virus have caused outbreaks of severe respiratory diseases in humans: severe acute respiratory syndrome coronavirus 1 (SARS-CoV or SARS-CoV-1), the cause of the 2002–2004 outbreak of severe acute respiratory syndrome (SARS), and severe acute respiratory syndrome coronavirus 2 (SARS-CoV-2), the cause of the COVID-19 pandemic. There are hundreds of other strains of SARSr-CoV, which are only known to infect non-human mammal species: bats are a major reservoir of many strains of SARSr-CoV; several strains have been identified in Himalayan palm civets, which were likely ancestors of SARS-CoV-1.

These enveloped, positive-sense single-stranded RNA viruses enter host cells by binding to the angiotensin-converting enzyme 2 (ACE2) receptor. The SARSr-CoV species is a member of the genus Betacoronavirus and the only species of the subgenus Sarbecovirus (SARS Betacoronavirus).

The SARS-related coronavirus was one of several viruses identified by the World Health Organization (WHO) in 2016 as a likely cause of a future epidemic in a new plan developed after the Ebola epidemic for urgent research and development before and during an epidemic towards diagnostic tests, vaccines and medicines. This prediction came to pass with the COVID-19 pandemic.

== Classification ==
SARS-related coronavirus is a member of the genus Betacoronavirus (group 2) and monotypic of the subgenus Sarbecovirus (subgroup B). Sarbecoviruses, unlike embecoviruses or alphacoronaviruses, have only one papain-like proteinase (PLpro) instead of two in the open reading frame ORF1ab. SARSr-CoV was determined to be an early split-off from the betacoronaviruses based on a set of conserved domains that it shares with the group.

Bats serve as the main host reservoir species for the SARS-related coronaviruses like SARS-CoV-1 and SARS-CoV-2. The virus has coevolved in the bat host reservoir over a long period of time. Only recently have strains of SARS-related coronavirus been observed to have evolved into having been able to make the cross-species jump from bats to humans, as in the case of the strains SARS-CoV-1 and SARS-CoV-2. Both of these strains descended from a single ancestor but made the cross-species jump into humans separately. SARS-CoV-2 is not a direct descendant of SARS-CoV-1.

== Genome ==
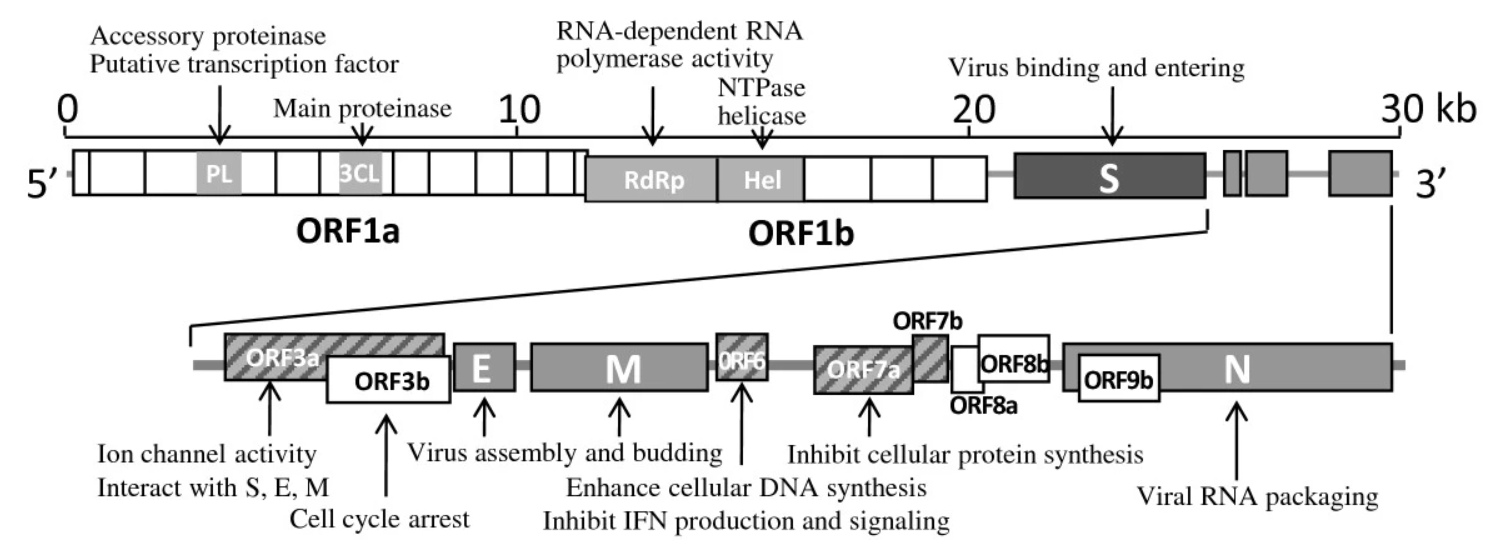
Genome organization and viral proteins of SARS-CoV

The SARS-related coronavirus is an enveloped, positive-sense, single-stranded RNA virus. Its genome is about 30 kb, which is one of the largest among RNA viruses. The virus has 14 open reading frames which overlap in some cases. The genome has the usual 5′ methylated cap and a 3′ polyadenylated tail. There are 265 nucleotides in the 5'UTR and 342 nucleotides in the 3'UTR.

The 5' methylated cap and 3' polyadenylated tail allows the positive-sense RNA genome to be directly translated by the host cell's ribosome on viral entry. SARSr-CoV is similar to other coronaviruses in that its genome expression starts with translation by the host cell's ribosomes of its initial two large overlapping open reading frames (ORFs), 1a and 1b, both of which produce polyproteins.

Function of SARSr-CoV genome proteins
Protein	Function
ORF1ab; P0C6X7	Replicase/transcriptase polyprotein (pp1ab) (nonstructural proteins)
ORF2; P59594	Spike (S) protein, virus binding and entry (structural protein)
ORF3a; P59632	Interacts with S, E, M structural proteins; Ion channel activity; Upregulates cytokines and chemokines such as IL-8 and RANTES; Upregulates NF-κB and JNK; Induces apoptosis and cell cycle arrest, via Caspase 8 and -9, and by Bax, p53, and p38 MAP kinase
ORF3b; P59633	Upregulates cytokines and chemokines by RUNX1b; Inhibits Type I IFN production and signaling; Induces apoptosis and cell cycle arrest;
ORF3c; P0DTG1	Unknown; first identified in SARS-CoV-2 but also present in SARS-CoV
ORF3d; P0DTG0	Novel gene in SARS-CoV-2, of unknown function
ORF4; P59637	Envelope (E) protein, virus assembly and budding (structural protein)
ORF5; P59596	Membrane (M) protein, virus assembly and budding (structural protein)
ORF6; P59634	Enhances cellular DNA synthesis; Inhibits Type I IFN production and signaling
ORF7a; P59635	Inhibits cellular protein synthesis; Induces inflammatory response by NF-kappaB and IL-8 promotor; Upregulate chemokines such as IL-8 and RANTES; Upregulates JNK, p38 MAP kinase; Induces apoptosis and cell cycle arrest
ORF7b; Q7TFA1	Unknown
ORF8a; Q7TFA0	Induces apoptosis through mitochondria pathway
ORF8b; Q80H93	Enhances cellular DNA synthesis, also known as X5.
ORF9a; P59595	Nucleocapsid (N) protein, viral RNA packaging (structural protein)
ORF9b; P59636	Induces apoptosis
ORF9c; Q7TLC7	Also known as ORF14; function unknown and may not be protein-coding
ORF10; A0A663DJA2	Novel gene in SARS-CoV-2, of unknown function; may not be protein-coding
UniProt identifiers shown for SARS-CoV proteins unless they are specific to SARS-CoV-2

The functions of several of the viral proteins are known. ORFs 1a and 1b encode the replicase/transcriptase polyprotein, and later ORFs 2, 4, 5, and 9a encode, respectively, the four major structural proteins: spike (S), envelope (E), membrane (M), and nucleocapsid (N). The later ORFs also encode for eight unique proteins (orf3a to orf9b), known as the accessory proteins, many with no known homologues. The different functions of the accessory proteins are not well understood.

SARS coronaviruses have been genetically engineered in several laboratories.

== Phylogenetics ==
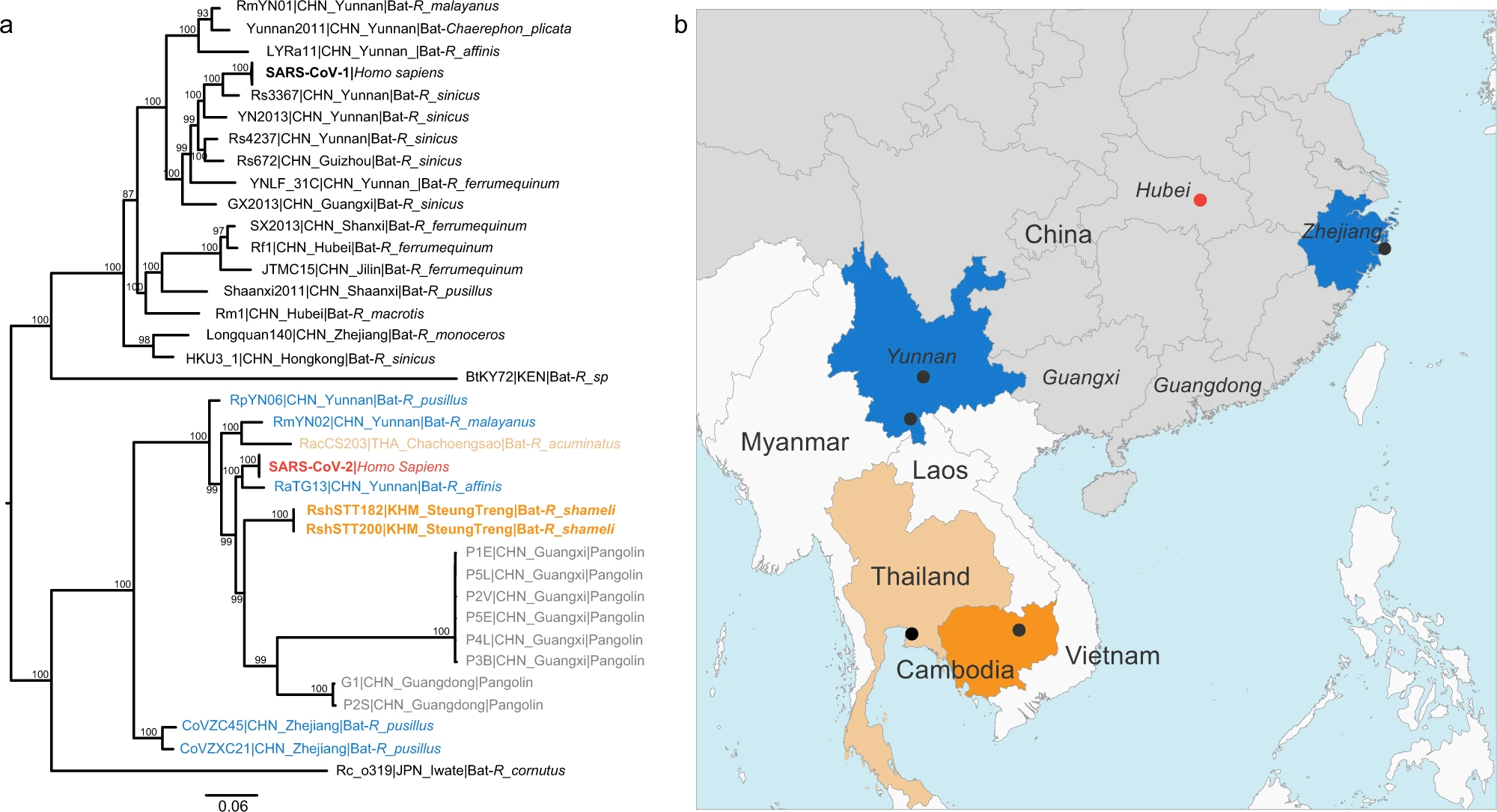
Phylogenetic tree of SARS-CoV-2 and closely related betacoronaviruses (left) and their geographic context (right)

Phylogenetic analysis showed that the evolutionary branch composed of Bat coronavirus BtKY72 and BM48-31 was the base group of SARS–related CoVs evolutionary tree, which separated from other SARS–related CoVs earlier than SARS-CoV-1 and SARS-CoV-2.

- SARSr‑CoV
  - - - Bat CoV BtKY72
    - - Bat CoV BM48-31
  - - - - - SARS-CoV-1 related coronavirus
    - - - - SARS-CoV-2 related coronavirus

=== SARS-CoV-1 related ===
A phylogenetic tree based on whole-genome sequences of SARS-CoV-1 and related coronaviruses is:

- SARS‑CoV‑1 related coronavirus
  - - - - 16BO133, 86.3% to SARS-CoV-1, Rhinolophus ferrumequinum, North Jeolla, South Korea
        - JTMC15, 86.4% to SARS-CoV-1, Rhinolophus ferrumequinum, Tonghua, Jilin
      - Bat SARS CoV Rf1, 87.8% to SARS-CoV-1, Rhinolophus ferrumequinum, Yichang, Hubei
    - - BtCoV HKU3, 87.9% to SARS-CoV-1, Rhinolophus sinicus, Hong Kong and Guangdong
    - - LYRa11, 90.9% to SARS-CoV-1, Rhinolophus affinis, Baoshan, Yunnan
      - - Bat SARS-CoV/Rp3, 92.6% to SARS-CoV-1, Rhinolophus pearsoni, Nanning, Guangxi
        - - Bat SL-CoV YNLF_31C, 93.5% to SARS-CoV-1, Rhinolophus ferrumequinum, Lufeng, Yunnan
          - Bat SL-CoV YNLF_34C, 93.5% to SARS-CoV-1, Rhinolophus ferrumequinum, Lufeng, Yunnan
        - - - - SHC014-CoV, 95.4% to SARS-CoV-1, Rhinolophus sinicus, Kunming, Yunnan
              - WIV1, 95.6% to SARS-CoV-1, Rhinolophus sinicus, Kunming, Yunnan
            - WIV16, 96.0% to SARS-CoV-1, Rhinolophus sinicus Kunming, Yunnan
          - - Civet SARS-CoV, 99.8% to SARS-CoV-1, Paguma larvata, market in Guangdong, China
            - SARS-CoV-1
- SARS-CoV-2, 79% to SARS-CoV-1

=== SARS-CoV-2 related ===
A phylogenetic tree based on whole-genome sequences of SARS-CoV-2 and related coronaviruses is:

- SARS‑CoV‑2 related coronavirus
  - (Bat) Rc-o319, 81% to SARS-CoV-2, Rhinolophus cornutus, Iwate, Japan
  - - - Bat SL-ZXC21, 88% to SARS-CoV-2, Rhinolophus pusillus, Zhoushan, Zhejiang
      - Bat SL-ZC45, 88% to SARS-CoV-2, Rhinolophus pusillus, Zhoushan, Zhejiang
    - - Pangolin SARSr-CoV-GX, 85.3% to SARS-CoV-2, Manis javanica, smuggled from Southeast Asia
      - - Pangolin SARSr-CoV-GD, 90.1% to SARS-CoV-2, Manis javanica, smuggled from Southeast Asia
        - - - Bat RshSTT182, 92.6% to SARS-CoV-2, Rhinolophus shameli, Steung Treng, Cambodia
            - Bat RshSTT200, 92.6% to SARS-CoV-2, Rhinolophus shameli, Steung Treng, Cambodia
          - - (Bat) RacCS203, 91.5% to SARS-CoV-2, Rhinolophus acuminatus, Chachoengsao, Thailand
            - (Bat) RmYN02, 93.3% to SARS-CoV-2, Rhinolophus malayanus, Mengla, Yunnan
          - (Bat) RpYN06, 94.4% to SARS-CoV-2, Rhinolophus pusillus, Xishuangbanna, Yunnan
          - - (Bat) RaTG13, 96.1% to SARS-CoV-2, Rhinolophus affinis, Mojiang, Yunnan
            - (Bat) BANAL-52, 96.8% to SARS-CoV-2, Rhinolophus malayanus, Vientiane, Laos
            - SARS-CoV-2
- SARS-CoV-1, 79% to SARS-CoV-2

== Morphology ==
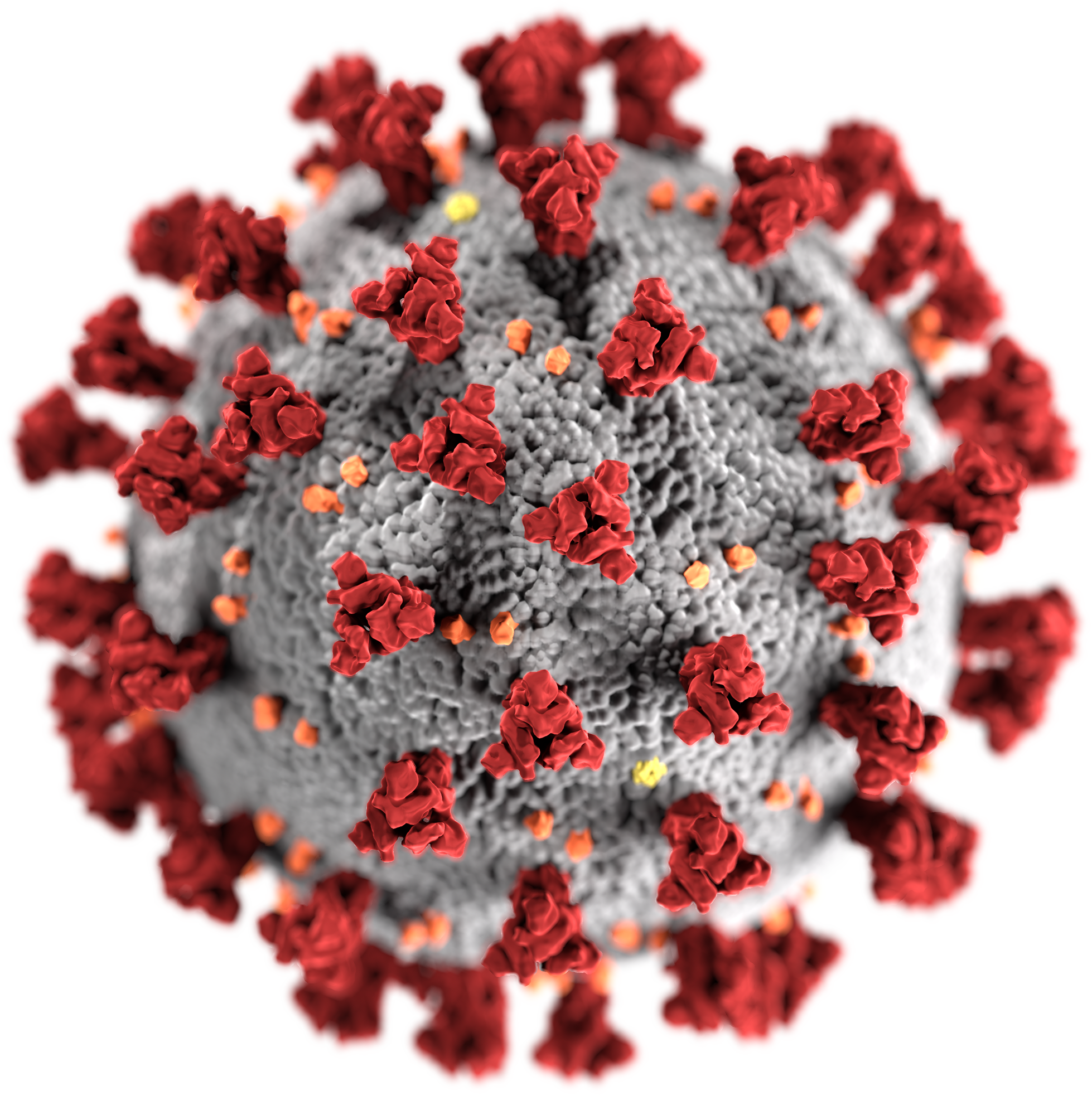
Illustration created at the Centers for Disease Control and Prevention (CDC), reveals ultrastructural morphology exhibited by coronaviruses; note the spikes that adorn the outer surface, which impart the look of a corona surrounding the virion.

Illustration of SARSr-CoV virion

The morphology of the SARS-related coronavirus is characteristic of the coronavirus family as a whole. The viruses are large pleomorphic spherical particles with bulbous surface projections that form a corona around the particles in electron micrographs. The size of the virus particles is in the 80–90 nm range. The envelope of the virus in electron micrographs appears as a distinct pair of electron dense shells.

The viral envelope consists of a lipid bilayer where the membrane (M), envelope (E) and spike (S) proteins are anchored. The spike proteins provide the virus with its bulbous surface projections, known as peplomers. The spike protein's interaction with its complement host cell receptor is central in determining the tissue tropism, infectivity, and species range of the virus.

Inside the envelope, there is the nucleocapsid, which is formed from multiple copies of the nucleocapsid (N) protein, which are bound to the positive-sense single-stranded (~30 kb) RNA genome in a continuous beads-on-a-string type conformation. The lipid bilayer envelope, membrane proteins, and nucleocapsid protect the virus when it is outside the host.

== Life cycle ==
SARS-related coronavirus follows the replication strategy typical of all coronaviruses.

=== Attachment and entry ===
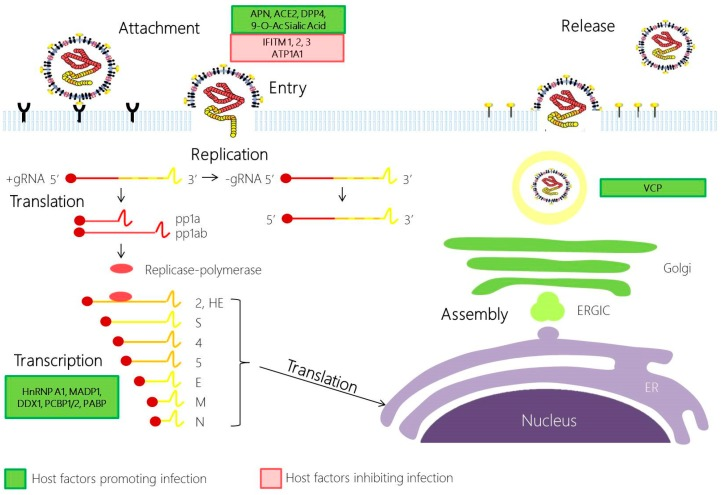
Coronavirus replication cycle

The attachment of the SARS-related coronavirus to the host cell is mediated by the spike protein and its receptor. The spike protein receptor binding domain (RBD) recognizes and attaches to the angiotensin-converting enzyme 2 (ACE2) receptor. Following attachment, the virus can enter the host cell by two different paths. The path the virus takes depends on the host protease available to cleave and activate the receptor-attached spike protein. A notable difference between SARS-CoV-1 and SARS-CoV-2, is that SARS-CoV-2 is pre-cleaved due to its furin cleavage site.

The attachment of sarbecoviruses to ACE2 has been shown to be an evolutionarily conserved feature, present in many (but not all) species of the taxon with ACE2 using representatives in Africa, Asia, and Europe.

The first path the SARS coronavirus can take to enter the host cell is by endocytosis and uptake of the virus in an endosome. The receptor-attached spike protein is then activated by the host's pH-dependent cysteine protease cathepsin L. Activation of the receptor-attached spike protein causes a conformational change, and the subsequent fusion of the viral envelope with the endosomal wall.

Alternatively, the virus can enter the host cell directly by proteolytic cleavage of the receptor-attached spike protein by the host's TMPRSS2 or TMPRSS11D serine proteases at the cell surface. In the SARS coronavirus, the activation of the C-terminal part of the spike protein triggers the fusion of the viral envelope with the host cell membrane by inducing conformational changes which are not fully understood.

=== Genome translation ===
Function of coronavirus nonstructural proteins (nsps)
Protein	Function
nsp1	Promotes host mRNA degradation, blocks host translation; blocks innate immune response
nsp2	Binds to prohibitin proteins; unknown function
nsp3	Multidoman transmembrane protein; interacts with N protein; promotes cytokine expression; PLPro domain cleaves polyprotein pp1ab and blocks host's innate immune response; other domains unknown functions
nsp4	Transmembrane scaffold protein; allows proper structure for double membrane vesicles (DMVs)
nsp5	3CLPro cleaves polyprotein pp1ab
nsp6	Transmembrane scaffold protein; unknown function
nsp7	Forms hexadecameric complex with nsp8; processivity clamp for RdRp (nsp12)
nsp8	Forms hexadecameric complex with nsp7; processivity clamp for RdRp (nsp12); acts as a primase
nsp9	RNA-binding protein (RBP)
nsp10	nsp16 and nsp14 cofactor; forms heterodimer with both; stimulates 2-O-MT (nsp16) and ExoN (nsp14) activity
nsp11	Unknown function
nsp12	RNA-dependent RNA polymerase (RdRp)
nsp13	RNA helicase, 5′ triphosphatase
nsp14	N7 Methyltransferase, 3′-5′ exoribonuclease (ExoN); N7 MTase adds 5′ cap, ExoN proofreads genome
nsp15	Endoribonuclease (NendoU)
nsp16	2′-O-Methyltransferase (2-O-MT); protects viral RNA from MDA5

After fusion the nucleocapsid passes into the cytoplasm, where the viral genome is released. The genome acts as a messenger RNA, and the cell's ribosome translates two-thirds of the genome, which corresponds to the open reading frame ORF1a and ORF1b, into two large overlapping polyproteins, pp1a and pp1ab.

The larger polyprotein pp1ab is a result of a -1 ribosomal frameshift caused by a slippery sequence (UUUAAAC) and a downstream RNA pseudoknot at the end of open reading frame ORF1a. The ribosomal frameshift allows for the continuous translation of ORF1a followed by ORF1b.

The polyproteins contain their own proteases, PLpro and 3CLpro, which cleave the polyproteins at different specific sites. The cleavage of polyprotein pp1ab yields 16 nonstructural proteins (nsp1 to nsp16). Product proteins include various replication proteins such as RNA-dependent RNA polymerase (RdRp), RNA helicase, and exoribonuclease (ExoN).

The two SARS-CoV-2 proteases (PLpro and 3CLpro) also interfere with the immune system response to the viral infection by cleaving three immune system proteins. PLpro cleaves IRF3 and 3CLpro cleaves both NLRP12 and TAB1. "Direct cleavage of IRF3 by NSP3 could explain the blunted Type-I IFN response seen during SARS-CoV-2 infections while NSP5 mediated cleavage of NLRP12 and TAB1 point to a molecular mechanism for enhanced production of IL-6 and inflammatory response observed in COVID-19 patients."

=== Replication and transcription ===
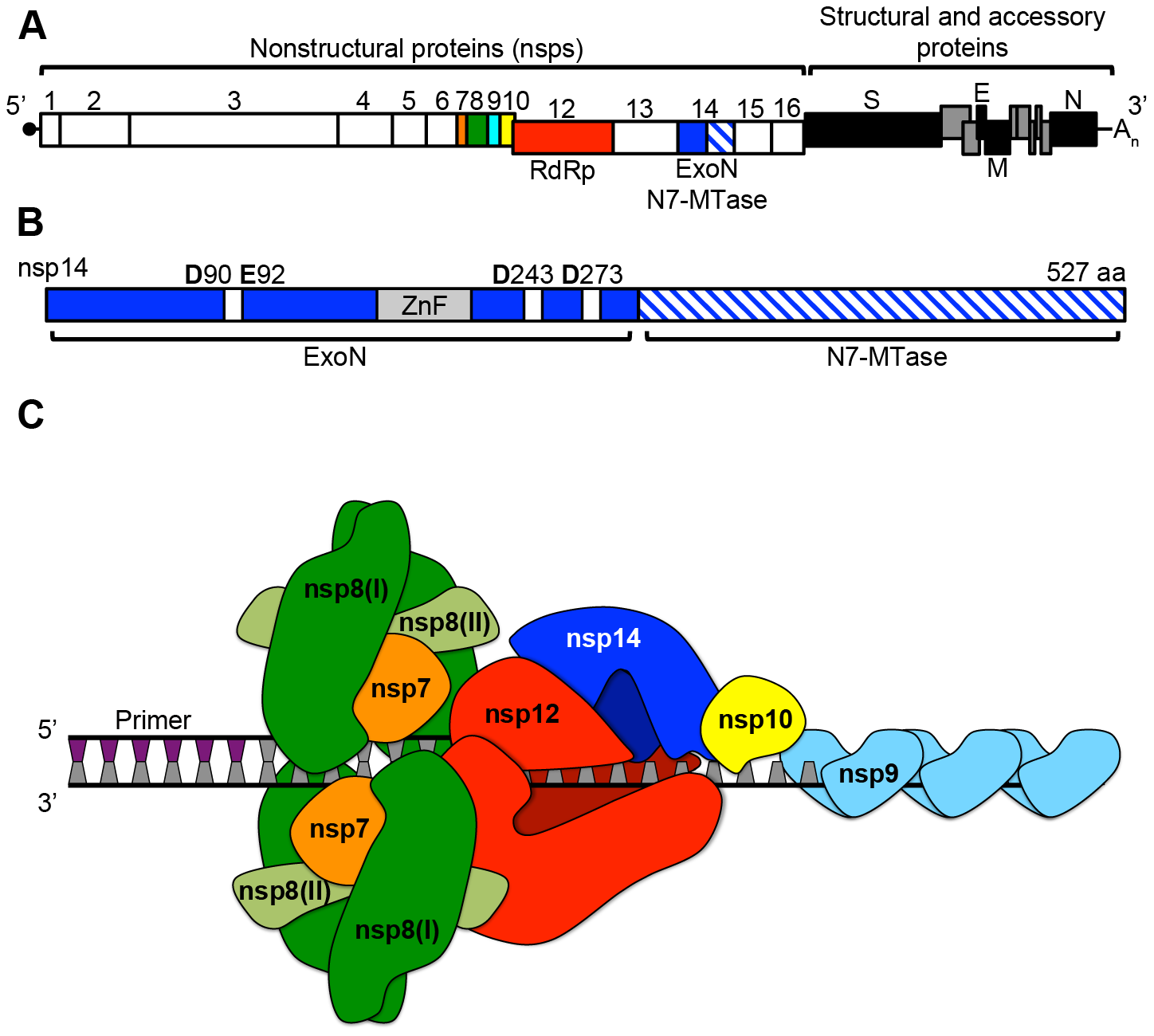
Model of the replicase-transcriptase complex of a coronavirus. RdRp for replication (red), ExoN for proofreading (dark blue), ExoN cofactor (yellow), RBPs to avoid secondary structure (light blue), RNA sliding clamp for processivity and primase domain for priming (green/orange), and a helicase to unwind RNA (downstream).

A number of the nonstructural replication proteins coalesce to form a multi-protein replicase-transcriptase complex (RTC). The main replicase-transcriptase protein is the RNA-dependent RNA polymerase (RdRp). It is directly involved in the replication and transcription of RNA from an RNA strand. The other nonstructural proteins in the complex assist in the replication and transcription process.

The protein nsp14 is a 3'-5' exoribonuclease which provides extra fidelity to the replication process. The exoribonuclease provides a proofreading function to the complex which the RNA-dependent RNA polymerase lacks. Similarly, proteins nsp7 and nsp8 form a hexadecameric sliding clamp as part of the complex which greatly increases the processivity of the RNA-dependent RNA polymerase. The coronaviruses require the increased fidelity and processivity during RNA synthesis because of the relatively large genome size in comparison to other RNA viruses.

One of the main functions of the replicase-transcriptase complex is to transcribe the viral genome. RdRp directly mediates the synthesis of negative-sense subgenomic RNA molecules from the positive-sense genomic RNA. This is followed by the transcription of these negative-sense subgenomic RNA molecules to their corresponding positive-sense mRNAs.

The other important function of the replicase-transcriptase complex is to replicate the viral genome. RdRp directly mediates the synthesis of negative-sense genomic RNA from the positive-sense genomic RNA. This is followed by the replication of positive-sense genomic RNA from the negative-sense genomic RNA. SARS-CoV replication and transcription mainly occurs in virus-induced double-membrane vesicles (DMVs) made from altered host endoplasmic reticulum.

The replicated positive-sense genomic RNA becomes the genome of the progeny viruses. The various smaller mRNAs are transcripts from the last third of the virus genome which follows the reading frames ORF1a and ORF1b. These mRNAs are translated into the four structural proteins (S, E, M, and N) that will become part of the progeny virus particles and also eight other accessory proteins (orf3 to orf9b) which assist the virus.

=== Recombination ===
When two SARS-CoV genomes are present in a host cell, they may interact with each other to form recombinant genomes that can be transmitted to progeny viruses. Recombination likely occurs during genome replication when the RNA polymerase switches from one template to another (copy choice recombination). Human SARS-CoV appears to have had a complex history of recombination between ancestral coronaviruses that were hosted in several different animal groups.

=== Assembly and release ===
RNA translation occurs inside the endoplasmic reticulum. The viral structural proteins S, E and M move along the secretory pathway into the Golgi intermediate compartment. There, the M proteins direct most protein-protein interactions required for assembly of viruses following its binding to the nucleocapsid. Progeny viruses are released from the host cell by exocytosis through secretory vesicles.

== See also ==
- Bat SARS-like coronavirus WIV1 (SL-CoV-WIV1)
- Bat SARS-like coronavirus RsSHC014
- Bat coronavirus RaTG13
- Civet SARS-CoV
