= LYRa11 =

Virus classification
- (unranked): Virus
- Realm: Riboviria
- Kingdom: Orthornavirae
- Phylum: Pisuviricota
- Class: Pisoniviricetes
- Order: Nidovirales
- Family: Coronaviridae
- Genus: Betacoronavirus
- Subgenus: Sarbecovirus
- Species: Betacoronavirus pandemicum
- Strain: LYRa11

Strain of virus

LYRa11 is a SARS-like coronavirus (SL-COV) which was identified in 2011 in samples of intermediate horseshoe bats in Baoshan, Yunnan, China. The genome of this virus strain is 29805nt long, and the similarity to the whole genome sequence of SARS-CoV that caused the SARS outbreak is 91%. It was published in 2014. Like SARS-CoV and SARS-CoV-2, LYRa11 virus uses ACE2 as a receptor for infecting cells.

== Phylogenetic ==
A phylogenetic tree based on whole-genome sequences of SARS-CoV-1 and related coronaviruses is:

- SARS‑CoV‑1 related coronavirus
  - - - - 16BO133, 86.3% to SARS-CoV-1, Rhinolophus ferrumequinum, North Jeolla, South Korea
        - JTMC15, 86.4% to SARS-CoV-1, Rhinolophus ferrumequinum, Tonghua, Jilin
      - Bat SARS CoV Rf1, 87.8% to SARS-CoV-1, Rhinolophus ferrumequinum, Yichang, Hubei
    - - BtCoV HKU3, 87.9% to SARS-CoV-1, Rhinolophus sinicus, Hong Kong and Guangdong
    - - LYRa11, 90.9% to SARS-CoV-1, Rhinolophus affinis, Baoshan, Yunnan
      - - Bat SARS-CoV/Rp3, 92.6% to SARS-CoV-1, Rhinolophus pearsoni, Nanning, Guangxi
        - - Bat SL-CoV YNLF_31C, 93.5% to SARS-CoV-1, Rhinolophus ferrumequinum, Lufeng, Yunnan
          - Bat SL-CoV YNLF_34C, 93.5% to SARS-CoV-1, Rhinolophus ferrumequinum, Lufeng, Yunnan
        - - - - SHC014-CoV, 95.4% to SARS-CoV-1, Rhinolophus sinicus, Kunming, Yunnan
              - WIV1, 95.6% to SARS-CoV-1, Rhinolophus sinicus, Kunming, Yunnan
            - WIV16, 96.0% to SARS-CoV-1, Rhinolophus sinicus Kunming, Yunnan
          - - Civet SARS-CoV, 99.8% to SARS-CoV-1, Paguma larvata, market in Guangdong, China
            - SARS-CoV-1
- SARS-CoV-2, 79% to SARS-CoV-1

== See also ==
- Bat coronavirus RaTG13

== Bibliography ==
- Data related to LYRa11 at Wikispecies
