= SHC014-CoV =

Virus classification
- (unranked): Virus
- Realm: Riboviria
- Kingdom: Orthornavirae
- Phylum: Pisuviricota
- Class: Pisoniviricetes
- Order: Nidovirales
- Family: Coronaviridae
- Genus: Betacoronavirus
- Subgenus: Sarbecovirus
- Species: Betacoronavirus pandemicum
- Strain: SHC014-CoV

Synonyms
- Bat SARS-like coronavirus RsSHC014

Strain of virus

SHC014-CoV is a SARS-like coronavirus (SL-COV) which infects horseshoe bats (family Rhinolophidae). It was discovered in Kunming in Yunnan Province, China. It was discovered along with SL-CoV Rs3367, which was the first bat SARS-like coronavirus shown to directly infect a human cell line. The line of Rs3367 that infected human cells was named Bat SARS-like coronavirus WIV1.

== Discovery ==
From April 2011 to September 2012, researchers from the Wuhan Institute of Virology collected 117 anal swabs and fecal samples of bats from a Chinese rufous horseshoe bats (Rhinolophus sinicus) colony in Kunming City (Yunnan Province in south-western China). 27 out of 117 samples (23%) contained seven different isolates of SARS-like coronaviruses, among which were two previously unknown, called RsSHC014 and Rs3367.

== Virology ==
In 2013, bat SARS-like coronavirus Rs3367 was shown to be able to directly infect the human HeLa cell line. It was the first time that human cells had been infected with a bat SARS-like coronavirus in the lab. The strain of Rs3367 that infected the human cells was named “Bat SARS-like coronavirus WIV”.

In 2015, the University of North Carolina at Chapel Hill and the Wuhan Institute of Virology conducted research showing that SHC014 could be made to infect the human HeLa cell line, through the use of reverse genetics to create a chimeric virus consisting of a surface protein of SHC014 and the backbone of a SARS coronavirus.

== Phylogenetic ==
A phylogenetic tree based on whole-genome sequences of SARS-CoV-1 and related coronaviruses is:

- SARS‑CoV‑1 related coronavirus
  - - - - 16BO133, 86.3% to SARS-CoV-1, Rhinolophus ferrumequinum, North Jeolla, South Korea
        - JTMC15, 86.4% to SARS-CoV-1, Rhinolophus ferrumequinum, Tonghua, Jilin
      - Bat SARS CoV Rf1, 87.8% to SARS-CoV-1, Rhinolophus ferrumequinum, Yichang, Hubei
    - - BtCoV HKU3, 87.9% to SARS-CoV-1, Rhinolophus sinicus, Hong Kong and Guangdong
    - - LYRa11, 90.9% to SARS-CoV-1, Rhinolophus affinis, Baoshan, Yunnan
      - - Bat SARS-CoV/Rp3, 92.6% to SARS-CoV-1, Rhinolophus pearsoni, Nanning, Guangxi
        - - Bat SL-CoV YNLF_31C, 93.5% to SARS-CoV-1, Rhinolophus ferrumequinum, Lufeng, Yunnan
          - Bat SL-CoV YNLF_34C, 93.5% to SARS-CoV-1, Rhinolophus ferrumequinum, Lufeng, Yunnan
        - - - - SHC014-CoV, 95.4% to SARS-CoV-1, Rhinolophus sinicus, Kunming, Yunnan
              - WIV1, 95.6% to SARS-CoV-1, Rhinolophus sinicus, Kunming, Yunnan
            - WIV16, 96.0% to SARS-CoV-1, Rhinolophus sinicus Kunming, Yunnan
          - - Civet SARS-CoV, 99.8% to SARS-CoV-1, Paguma larvata, market in Guangdong, China
            - SARS-CoV-1
- SARS-CoV-2, 79% to SARS-CoV-1

== See also ==
- Bat coronavirus RaTG13
