= 16BO133 =

Virus classification
- (unranked): Virus
- Realm: Riboviria
- Kingdom: Orthornavirae
- Phylum: Pisuviricota
- Class: Pisoniviricetes
- Order: Nidovirales
- Family: Coronaviridae
- Genus: Betacoronavirus
- Subgenus: Sarbecovirus
- Species: Betacoronavirus pandemicum
- Strain: 16BO133

Strain of virus

16BO133 is a SARS-like coronavirus (SL-COV) which was found in the greater horseshoe bat in South Korea. It was published in 2019 and its genome was completely sequenced. The sequenced Korean SARSr-CoV strain belongs to the severe acute respiratory syndrome coronavirus 1, and its genome sequence similarity is 82.8%.

== Discovery ==
The 16BO133 virus was discovered in the oral cavity of the greater horseshoe bat in 2016. The genome of this virus strain is 29075 nt. Among SARSr-CoVs, 16BO133 is the closest to the JTMC15 virus, which was published in 2016 and discovered in Jilin, China, with a genome nucleic acid sequence similarity of 98.3%. Compared with other SARSr-CoVs, these two viruses have the ORF8 strain due to a frameshift mutation at the end of ORF7b. The similarity of the genome nucleic acid sequence of 16BO133 virus and SARS-CoV is 82.8%.

Although other SARSr-CoV strains have been found in Korea in the past (B15-21 virus, etc.), none of them have been sequenced. The 16BO133 virus is the first Korean SARSr-CoV strain to be completely sequenced.

== Phylogenetic ==
A phylogenetic tree based on whole-genome sequences of SARS-CoV-1 and related coronaviruses is:

- SARS‑CoV‑1 related coronavirus
  - - - - 16BO133, 86.3% to SARS-CoV-1, Rhinolophus ferrumequinum, North Jeolla, South Korea
        - JTMC15, 86.4% to SARS-CoV-1, Rhinolophus ferrumequinum, Tonghua, Jilin
      - Bat SARS CoV Rf1, 87.8% to SARS-CoV-1, Rhinolophus ferrumequinum, Yichang, Hubei
    - - BtCoV HKU3, 87.9% to SARS-CoV-1, Rhinolophus sinicus, Hong Kong and Guangdong
    - - LYRa11, 90.9% to SARS-CoV-1, Rhinolophus affinis, Baoshan, Yunnan
      - - Bat SARS-CoV/Rp3, 92.6% to SARS-CoV-1, Rhinolophus pearsoni, Nanning, Guangxi
        - - Bat SL-CoV YNLF_31C, 93.5% to SARS-CoV-1, Rhinolophus ferrumequinum, Lufeng, Yunnan
          - Bat SL-CoV YNLF_34C, 93.5% to SARS-CoV-1, Rhinolophus ferrumequinum, Lufeng, Yunnan
        - - - - SHC014-CoV, 95.4% to SARS-CoV-1, Rhinolophus sinicus, Kunming, Yunnan
              - WIV1, 95.6% to SARS-CoV-1, Rhinolophus sinicus, Kunming, Yunnan
            - WIV16, 96.0% to SARS-CoV-1, Rhinolophus sinicus Kunming, Yunnan
          - - Civet SARS-CoV, 99.8% to SARS-CoV-1, Paguma larvata, market in Guangdong, China
            - SARS-CoV-1
- SARS-CoV-2, 79% to SARS-CoV-1

== See also ==
- Bat coronavirus RaTG13
