= Civet SARS-CoV =

Virus classification
- (unranked): Virus
- Realm: Riboviria
- Kingdom: Orthornavirae
- Phylum: Pisuviricota
- Class: Pisoniviricetes
- Order: Nidovirales
- Family: Coronaviridae
- Genus: Betacoronavirus
- Subgenus: Sarbecovirus
- Species: Betacoronavirus pandemicum
- Strain: Civet SARS-CoV

Respiratory virus

Civet SARS-CoV is a coronavirus associated with severe acute respiratory syndrome coronavirus (SARS-CoV), which infected humans and caused SARS events from 2002 to 2003. It infected the masked palm civet. The severe acute respiratory syndrome coronavirus (SARS-CoV) is highly similar, with a genome sequence similarity of about 99.8%. Because several patients infected at the early stage of the epidemic had contact with fruit-eating Japanese raccoon dog (also called tanuki) in the market, tanuki may be a direct source of human SARS coronavirus. At the end of 2003, four more people in Guangzhou, China, were infected with the disease. Sequence analysis found that the similarity with the tanuki virus reached 99.9%, and the SARS coronavirus was also caused by cases of tanuki transmission.

A follow-up study of masked palm civet has not been found in a few cases, indicating that fruit tanuki may not be the natural host of SARS coronavirus, but only an intermediate host of the virus from a natural reservoir (bat) to humans. Although the tanuki SARS coronavirus is highly similar to that of human SARS coronavirus, there are a few points in the receptor binding domain (RBD) of burden protein, and the ORF8, which encoded auxiliary protein, has a long 29nt sequence than the human virus. When the virus is infected human by a species barrier, These areas change, which may be related to adapting the new environment.

== Discovery ==
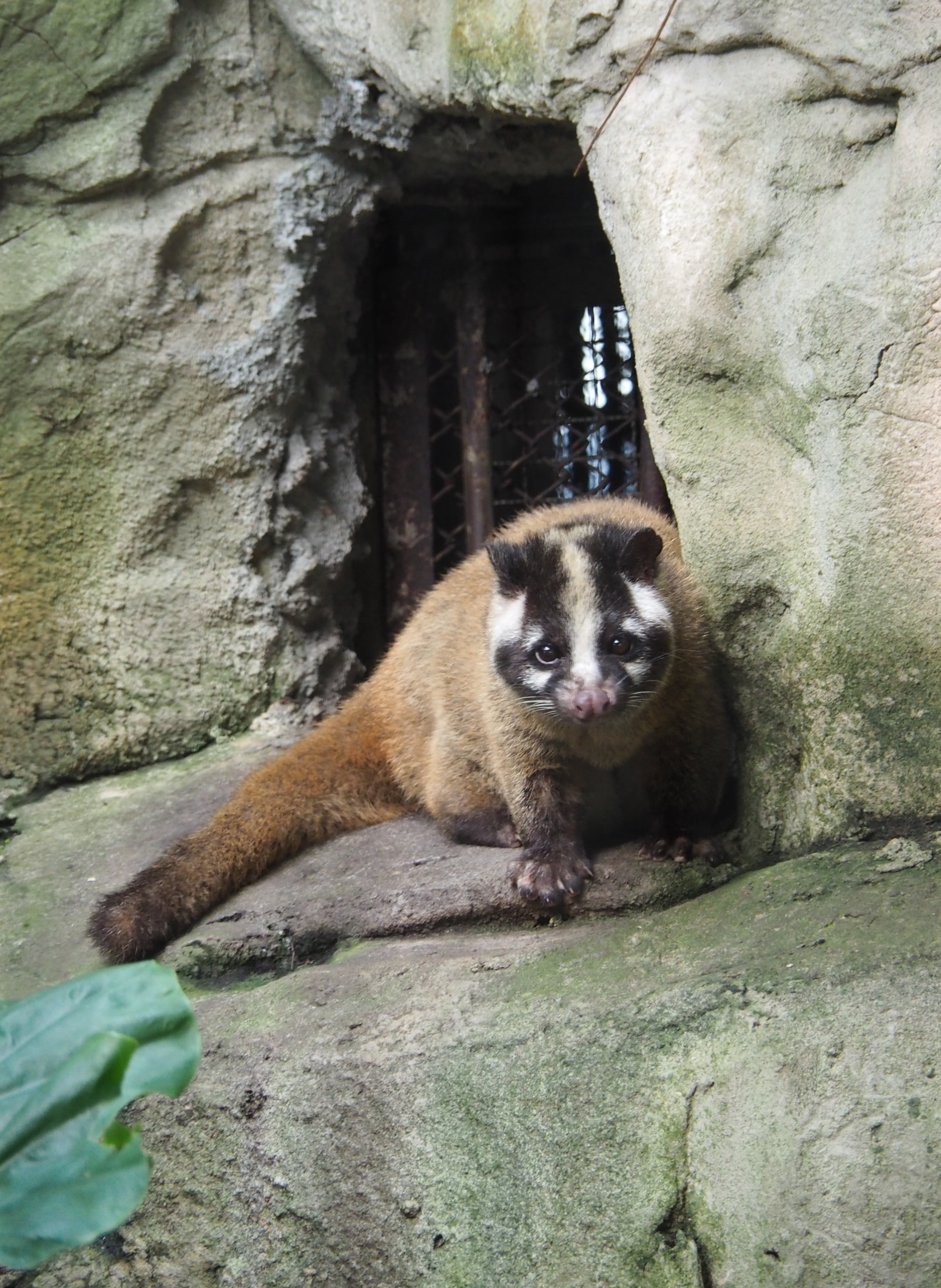
Masked palm civet

After the outbreak of SARS, researchers tested wild animals sold in the Shenzhen Guangdong, China. They found that the masked palm civet, raccoon dog and chinese ferret-badger had Severe acute respiratory syndrome-related coronavirus, and obtained two complete Severe acute respiratory syndrome-related coronavirus genome sequences, SZ3 and SZ16 from the nasal samples of masked palm civet. The sequence similarity of SARS coronavirus Tor2 is 99.8%, and a serum test of market staff who are often exposed to fruit tanuki has found that they have a higher rate of SARS antibody than the general population, indicating that tanuki may be a direct source of SARS coronavirus. In May 2003, masked palm civet in the Guangdong was slaughtered to control the epidemic, and it was not sold again until the ban was lifted at the end of August.

In December 2003, six months after the World Health Organization announced that the SARS epidemic was under control, a new outbreak broke out in Guangzhou, in which four people were infected. The masked palm civet sold in the local market and restaurants also detected severe acute respiratory syndrome coronavirus (Civet007, Civet010, Cive). T014, Civet019, Civet020, the sequence is 99.9% similar to the severe acute respiratory syndrome coronavirus sequence of two patients (cafeteria waiters and customers), indicating that the virus infected with these four people is not a human virus from the 2002-2003 epidemic, but masked palm civet. Masked palm civet is a case of human re-infected with masked palm civet. Due to the resumption of the epidemic, the masked palm civet in Guangzhou market was once again slaughtered for epidemic prevention.

At the end of 2004, researchers investigated the masked palm civet in farms in Guangdong, Hunan and Henan, and only some individuals with severe acute respiratory syndrome-related coronavirus antibody were found on a farm in Shanwei, Guangdong. The following year, more than 1,000 the masked palm civet were surveyed in 12 provinces of China, and wild masked palm civet in Hong Kong were also investigated. No individual was found infected with severe acute respiratory syndrome-related coronavirus. (Note: Researchers at the Wuhan Institute of Virology found SARS coronavirus in the masked palm civet cultivated in Hubei Province, which is a very few cases of finding SARS coronavirus in tanuki fruit outside the market) The former survey was conducted for a civet farmer in Henan for the Guangzhou market. The masked palm civet test is positive in the market, but all individuals in Henan farms are negative, indicating that the masked palm civet should be infected in the market. In addition, a typical clinical symptoms of fruit tanuki can be seen in the laboratory after being infected with human severe acute respiratory syndrome-related coronavirus. These studies show that masked palm civet may be the source of human severe acute respiratory syndrome-related coronavirus, but it should not be its natural reservoir, but only an intermediate host that accelerates the spread of the virus from the natural reservoir to humans, and it itself is also It's infected with other animals to have a virus.

== Phylogenetic ==
A phylogenetic tree based on whole-genome sequences of SARS-CoV-1 and related coronaviruses is:

- SARS‑CoV‑1 related coronavirus
  - - - - 16BO133, 86.3% to SARS-CoV-1, Rhinolophus ferrumequinum, North Jeolla, South Korea
        - JTMC15, 86.4% to SARS-CoV-1, Rhinolophus ferrumequinum, Tonghua, Jilin
      - Bat SARS CoV Rf1, 87.8% to SARS-CoV-1, Rhinolophus ferrumequinum, Yichang, Hubei
    - - BtCoV HKU3, 87.9% to SARS-CoV-1, Rhinolophus sinicus, Hong Kong and Guangdong
    - - LYRa11, 90.9% to SARS-CoV-1, Rhinolophus affinis, Baoshan, Yunnan
      - - Bat SARS-CoV/Rp3, 92.6% to SARS-CoV-1, Rhinolophus pearsoni, Nanning, Guangxi
        - - Bat SL-CoV YNLF_31C, 93.5% to SARS-CoV-1, Rhinolophus ferrumequinum, Lufeng, Yunnan
          - Bat SL-CoV YNLF_34C, 93.5% to SARS-CoV-1, Rhinolophus ferrumequinum, Lufeng, Yunnan
        - - - - SHC014-CoV, 95.4% to SARS-CoV-1, Rhinolophus sinicus, Kunming, Yunnan
              - WIV1, 95.6% to SARS-CoV-1, Rhinolophus sinicus, Kunming, Yunnan
            - WIV16, 96.0% to SARS-CoV-1, Rhinolophus sinicus Kunming, Yunnan
          - - Civet SARS-CoV, 99.8% to SARS-CoV-1, Paguma larvata, market in Guangdong, China
            - SARS-CoV-1
- SARS-CoV-2, 79% to SARS-CoV-1

== Difference from human SARS coronavirus ==
The genome sequence of Civet SARS-CoV is highly similar to that of human SARS coronavirus. The differences include the insertion sequence of 29 nucleobase in the ORF8, which encodes auxiliary proteins, and the difference between the few points of the binding domain (RBD) of the receptor binding of spike protein and host cell receptor ACE2.
