= Bat SARS-like coronavirus WIV1 =

Virus classification
- (unranked): Virus
- Realm: Riboviria
- Kingdom: Orthornavirae
- Phylum: Pisuviricota
- Class: Pisoniviricetes
- Order: Nidovirales
- Family: Coronaviridae
- Genus: Betacoronavirus
- Subgenus: Sarbecovirus
- Species: Betacoronavirus pandemicum
- Strain: Bat SARS-like coronavirus WIV1

Synonyms
- SARS-like coronavirus WIV1; Bat SL-CoV-WIV1

Species of virus

Bat SARS-like coronavirus WIV1 (Bat SL-CoV-WIV1), also sometimes called SARS-like coronavirus WIV1, is a strain of severe acute respiratory syndrome–related coronavirus (SARSr-CoV) isolated from Chinese rufous horseshoe bats in 2013 (Rhinolophus sinicus). Like all coronaviruses, virions consist of single-stranded positive-sense RNA enclosed within an envelope.

WIV1 was named for the Wuhan Institute of Virology, where it was discovered by a researcher on Shi Zhengli's team.

In 2018, Ralph S. Baric and Vincent Munster of Rocky Mountain Laboratories infected Egyptian fruit bat (Rousettus aegyptiacus) with WIV1. SARS-CoV-2 transmits efficiently in Egyptian fruit bats.

== Zoonosis ==
The discovery confirms that bats are the natural reservoir of SARS-CoV. Phylogenetic analysis shows the possibility of direct transmission of SARS from bats to humans without the intermediary Chinese civets, as previously believed.

== Phylogenetic ==
A phylogenetic tree based on whole-genome sequences of SARS-CoV-1 and related coronaviruses is:

- SARS‑CoV‑1 related coronavirus
  - - - - 16BO133, 86.3% to SARS-CoV-1, Rhinolophus ferrumequinum, North Jeolla, South Korea
        - JTMC15, 86.4% to SARS-CoV-1, Rhinolophus ferrumequinum, Tonghua, Jilin
      - Bat SARS CoV Rf1, 87.8% to SARS-CoV-1, Rhinolophus ferrumequinum, Yichang, Hubei
    - - BtCoV HKU3, 87.9% to SARS-CoV-1, Rhinolophus sinicus, Hong Kong and Guangdong
    - - LYRa11, 90.9% to SARS-CoV-1, Rhinolophus affinis, Baoshan, Yunnan
      - - Bat SARS-CoV/Rp3, 92.6% to SARS-CoV-1, Rhinolophus pearsoni, Nanning, Guangxi
        - - Bat SL-CoV YNLF_31C, 93.5% to SARS-CoV-1, Rhinolophus ferrumequinum, Lufeng, Yunnan
          - Bat SL-CoV YNLF_34C, 93.5% to SARS-CoV-1, Rhinolophus ferrumequinum, Lufeng, Yunnan
        - - - - SHC014-CoV, 95.4% to SARS-CoV-1, Rhinolophus sinicus, Kunming, Yunnan
              - WIV1, 95.6% to SARS-CoV-1, Rhinolophus sinicus, Kunming, Yunnan
            - WIV16, 96.0% to SARS-CoV-1, Rhinolophus sinicus Kunming, Yunnan
          - - Civet SARS-CoV, 99.8% to SARS-CoV-1, Paguma larvata, market in Guangdong, China
            - SARS-CoV-1
- SARS-CoV-2, 79% to SARS-CoV-1

== See also ==
- Bat as food
- Bat coronavirus RaTG13
- Bat virome
- SARS-CoV-2
- Wuhan Institute of Virology (WIV)
