= Qinfeng =

Qinfeng may refer to:

- Qinfeng, Jiangxi (秦峰), a town in Shangrao, Jiangxi, China
- Qinfeng, Yunnan (勤丰), a town in Lufeng County, Yunnan, China
- Qinfeng Circuit (秦鳳路), a circuit (province) split from Shaanxi Circuit during the Song dynasty
- Qinfeng Village, a village in the subdistrict Donghe, Jishou, Hunan, China
