= ORF10 =

Open reading frame found in the genome of the SARS-CoV-2 coronavirus

Orf10 protein, SARS-CoV-2

Identifiers
- Symbol: Orf10_SARS-CoV-2
- InterPro: IPR044342
Available protein structures:
- PDB: IPR044342
- AlphaFold: IPR044342

ORF10 is an open reading frame (ORF) found in the genome of the SARS-CoV-2 coronavirus. It is 38 codons long. It is not conserved in all Sarbecoviruses (including SARS-CoV). In studies prompted by the COVID-19 pandemic, ORF10 attracted research interest as one of two viral accessory protein genes not conserved between SARS-CoV and SARS-CoV-2 and was initially described as a protein-coding gene likely under positive selection. However, although it is sometimes included in lists of SARS-CoV-2 accessory genes, experimental and bioinformatics evidence suggests ORF10 is likely not a functional protein-coding gene.

== Properties ==
ORF10 is located downstream of the N gene, which encodes coronavirus nucleocapsid protein. It is the annotated open reading frame closest to the 3' end of the genome. It encodes a 38-amino acid hypothetical protein.

== Expression and function ==
It is unlikely that ORF10 is translated under natural conditions, since subgenomic RNA containing the ORF10 region is not detected, though there is some ribosome footprinting signal. When experimentally overexpressed, the ORF10 protein has been reported to interact with ZYG11B and its cullin-RING ligase protein complex. However, this interaction has been shown to be dispensable in in vitro studies of the viral life cycle.

== Evolution ==
Some studies of SARS-CoV-2 genomes have described ORF10 as likely to be functional and under positive selection. However, premature stop codons have been identified in SARS-CoV-2 variants and in many Sarbecovirus sequences, suggesting that the putative protein product is not essential for viral replication. Loss of ORF10 has also shown no effect on replication under experimental conditions in vitro. It has been suggested through bioinformatics analysis that apparent sequence conservation in SARS-CoV-2 ORF10 may not be due to a protein-coding function, but instead due to conserved RNA secondary structure in the region. The conserved region, which extends beyond ORF10 itself, overlaps with the coronavirus 3' UTR pseudoknot region, a secondary structure known to be involved in genome replication.
