= Shihu, Jilin =

Shihu 石湖镇
- Town
- Location in Jilin
- Coordinates: 41°41′30″N 125°46′4″E
- Country: People's Republic of China
- Province: Jilin
- Prefecture-level city: Tonghua
- County: Tonghua County
- Time zone: UTC+8 (China Standard)

Shihu (Chinese: 石湖; pinyin: Shíhú) is a town in Tonghua County, Jilin province, China. As of 2020, it administers Huimin Residential Community (惠民社区) and the following three villages:

- Gongyi Village (公益村)
- Laoling Village (老岭村)
- Yong'an Village (永安村)
