= ZYG11B =

Protein-coding gene in humans

Identifiers
- Aliases: ZYG11B, ZYG11, zyg-11 family member B, cell cycle regulator
- External IDs: MGI: 2685277; GeneCards: ZYG11B

Gene location (Human)
Chr.	Chromosome 1 (human)
Band	1p32.3	Start	52,726,453 bp
Band	1p32.3	End	52,827,336 bp

Gene location (Mouse)
Chr.	Chromosome 4 (mouse)
Band	4|4 C7	Start	108,086,921 bp
Band	4|4 C7	End	108,158,293 bp
RNA expression pattern
Bgee	Human / Mouse (ortholog); Top expressed in: deltoid muscle; vastus lateralis muscle; tibialis anterior muscle; biceps brachii; Skeletal muscle tissue of biceps brachii; Skeletal muscle tissue of rectus abdominis; cardiac muscle tissue of right atrium; myocardium of left ventricle; right ventricle; middle temporal gyrus / Top expressed in: medial vestibular nucleus; medial dorsal nucleus; mammillary body; lateral hypothalamus; ventral tegmental area; lateral geniculate nucleus; dorsal tegmental nucleus; medial geniculate nucleus; ventromedial nucleus; dorsomedial hypothalamic nucleus; More reference expression data
BioGPS	n/a
Gene ontology
Molecular function	ubiquitin-protein transferase activity
Cellular component	Cul2-RING ubiquitin ligase complex
Biological process	regulation of ubiquitin-protein transferase activity; protein ubiquitination
Sources:Amigo / QuickGO
Orthologs
Databases	NCBI: entry; OMA: entry
Species	Human	Mouse
Entrez	79699	414872
Ensembl	ENSG00000162378	ENSMUSG00000034636
UniProt	Q9C0D3	Q3UFS0
RefSeq (mRNA)	NM_024646	NM_001033634
RefSeq (protein)	NP_078922	NP_001028806
Location (UCSC)	Chr 1: 52.73 – 52.83 Mb	Chr 4: 108.09 – 108.16 Mb
PubMed search
- Wikidata
View/Edit Human	View/Edit Mouse

Zyg-11 family member B, cell cycle regulator is a protein that in humans is encoded by the ZYG11B gene.
