= Triphosphatase =

Class of enzymes

triphosphatase

Identifiers
- EC no.: 3.6.1.25
- CAS no.: 62213-21-2

Databases
- IntEnz: IntEnz view
- BRENDA: BRENDA entry
- ExPASy: NiceZyme view
- KEGG: KEGG entry
- MetaCyc: metabolic pathway
- PRIAM: profile
- PDB structures: RCSB PDB PDBe PDBsum
- Gene Ontology: AmiGO / QuickGO
Search
- PMC: articles
- PubMed: articles
- NCBI: proteins

In enzymology, a triphosphatase (EC 3.6.1.25) is an enzyme that catalyzes the chemical reaction

triphosphate + H_{2}O $\rightleftharpoons$ diphosphate + phosphate

Thus, the two substrates of this enzyme are triphosphate and H_{2}O, whereas its two products are diphosphate and phosphate.

This enzyme belongs to the family of hydrolases, specifically those acting on acid anhydrides in phosphorus-containing anhydrides. The systematic name of this enzyme class is triphosphate phosphohydrolase. This enzyme is also called inorganic triphosphatase.
