= TMPRSS11D =

Protein-coding gene in the species Homo sapiens

Identifiers
- Aliases: TMPRSS11D, HAT, transmembrane protease, serine 11D, transmembrane serine protease 11D, ASP
- External IDs: OMIM: 605369; MGI: 2385221; GeneCards: TMPRSS11D

Gene location (Human)
Chr.	Chromosome 4 (human)
Band	4q13.2	Start	67,820,876 bp
Band	4q13.2	End	67,884,002 bp

Gene location (Mouse)
Chr.	Chromosome 5 (mouse)
Band	5|5 E1	Start	86,450,076 bp
Band	5|5 E1	End	86,521,279 bp
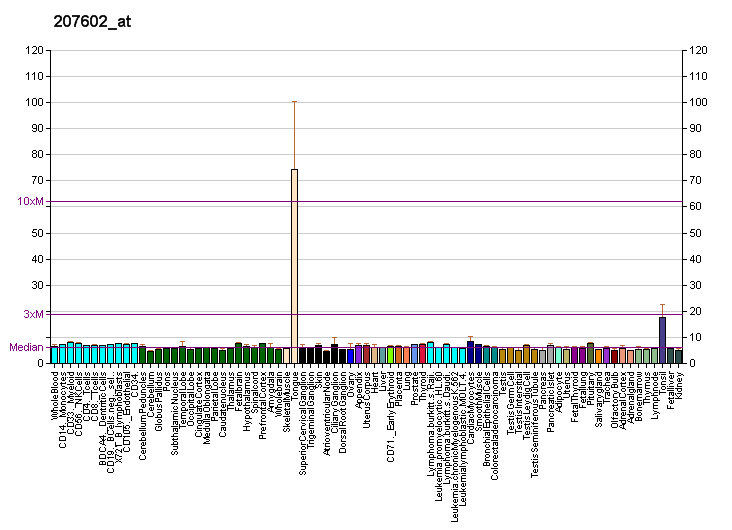

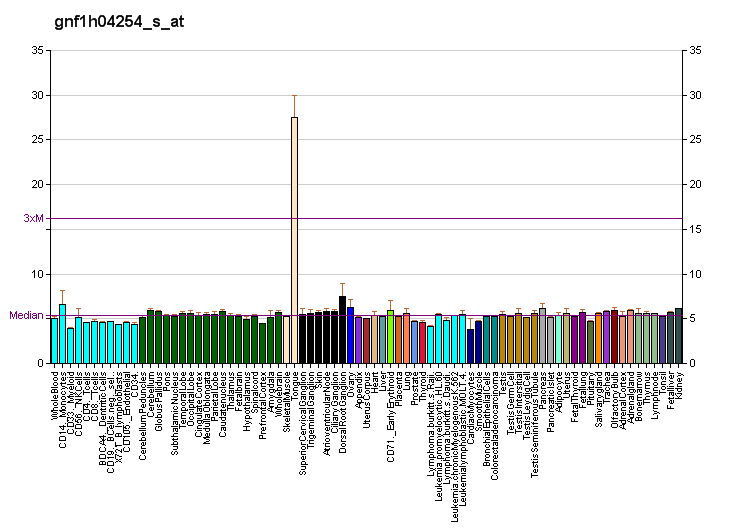
RNA expression pattern
Bgee	Human / Mouse (ortholog); Top expressed in: gums; gingival epithelium; cervix epithelium; oral cavity; body of tongue; amniotic fluid; mucosa of pharynx; buccal mucosa cell; periodontal fiber; human penis / Top expressed in: esophagus; external naris; mucosa of esophagus; epithelium of esophagus; lip; cervix; cornea; stomach; neural layer of retina; lacrimal gland; More reference expression data
BioGPS	More reference expression data
Gene ontology
Molecular function	peptidase activity; serine-type peptidase activity; hydrolase activity; serine-type endopeptidase activity
Cellular component	integral component of membrane; extracellular region; plasma membrane; integral component of plasma membrane; extracellular exosome; membrane
Biological process	respiratory gaseous exchange by respiratory system; proteolysis
Sources:Amigo / QuickGO
Orthologs
Databases	NCBI: entry; OMA: entry
Species	Human	Mouse
Entrez	9407	231382
Ensembl	ENSG00000153802	ENSMUSG00000061259
UniProt	O60235	Q8VHK8
RefSeq (mRNA)	NM_004262	NM_145561
RefSeq (protein)	NP_004253	NP_663536
Location (UCSC)	Chr 4: 67.82 – 67.88 Mb	Chr 5: 86.45 – 86.52 Mb
PubMed search
- Wikidata
View/Edit Human	View/Edit Mouse

Transmembrane protease, serine 11D is an enzyme that in humans is encoded by the TMPRSS11D gene.

This gene encodes a trypsin-like serine protease released from the submucosal serous glands onto mucous membrane. It is a type II integral membrane protein and has 29-38% identity in the sequence of the catalytic region with human hepsin, enteropeptidase, acrosin, and mast cell tryptase. The noncatalytic region has little similarity to other known proteins. This protein may play some biological role in the host defense system on the mucous membrane independently of or in cooperation with other substances in airway mucous or bronchial secretions.
