= Qinfeng, Yunnan =

Qinfeng 勤丰镇
- Town
- Location within Yunnan Location within China
- Coordinates: 25.18268°N 102.2954°E
- Country: People's Republic of China
- Province: Yunnan
- Prefecture: Chuxiong Yi Autonomous Prefecture
- County: Lufeng County

Area
  - Total: 258.3 km^{2} (99.7 sq mi)

Population (2010)
  - Total: 26,600
- Time zone: UTC+8 (China Standard Time)

Qinfeng is a town in Lufeng County, Yunnan, China.
