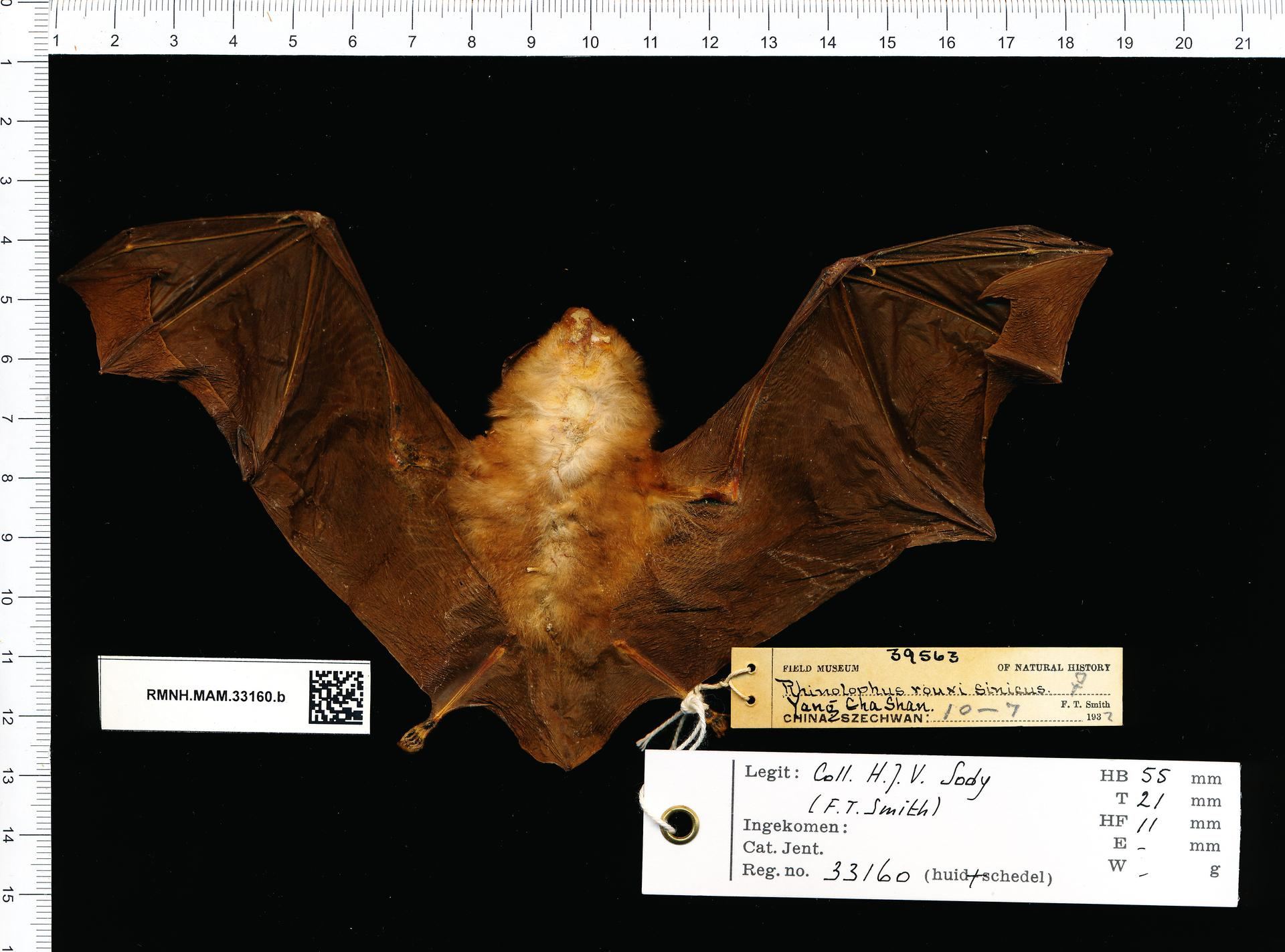

Conservation status
- Least Concern (IUCN 3.1)

Scientific classification
- Kingdom: Animalia
- Phylum: Chordata
- Class: Mammalia
- Order: Chiroptera
- Family: Rhinolophidae
- Genus: Rhinolophus
- Species: R. sinicus

Binomial name
- Rhinolophus sinicus K. Andersen, 1905

Subspecies
- Two; see text
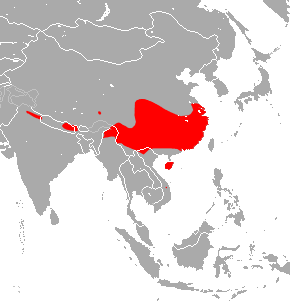
- Chinese rufous horseshoe bat range

= Chinese rufous horseshoe bat =

Species of bat

The Chinese rufous horseshoe bat (Rhinolophus sinicus) is a species of bat in the family Rhinolophidae. It is found in Bhutan, China, India, Nepal, and Vietnam.

The species is most easily confused with R. affinis, from which it is best distinguished by its straight-sided lancet and the relatively short second phalanx of the third digit (< 66% of the length of the metacarpal; Csorba et al. 2003).

== Subspecies ==
Rhinolophus sinicus is divided into the following two subspecies:

- R. s. septentrionalis
- R. s. sinicus

== Description ==
The Chinese rufous horseshoe bat has a forearm length of 43–56 mm (1.7–2.2 in). It has an ear length of 15–20 mm (0.59–0.79 in) and a tail length of 21–30 mm (0.83–1.18 in). Overall, it is considered a medium-sized horseshoe bat. It is similar in appearance to the rufous horseshoe bat, though with longer wings. While also similar to Thomas's horseshoe bat, it is slightly larger. The fur on its back is bicolored: the basal two-thirds of individual hairs are brownish-white, while the tips of the hairs are reddish brown. Its belly fur is paler in color and is brownish-white.

== Biology and ecology ==
The Chinese rufous horseshoe bat is a social animal, forming colonies of a few individuals up to several hundred. During the reproductive season, the sexes segregate, with females forming maternity colonies. Additionally this species is a food source of the parasite Sinospelaeobdella, a jawed land leech. They roost in caves, often with other bat species.

== Conservation status ==
Chinese rufous horseshoe bats are a least-concern species, assessed by the Red List of Threatened Species on the basis that it has fairly wide distribution and is locally common in southeast Asia. The species is not listed in the Law of the People's Republic of China on the Protection of Wildlife in 1989.

== Disease ==
Bats of this species form the natural reservoir of severe acute respiratory syndrome–related coronavirus (SARS-CoV). An example of one particular strain present is Bat SARS-like coronavirus WIV1.
