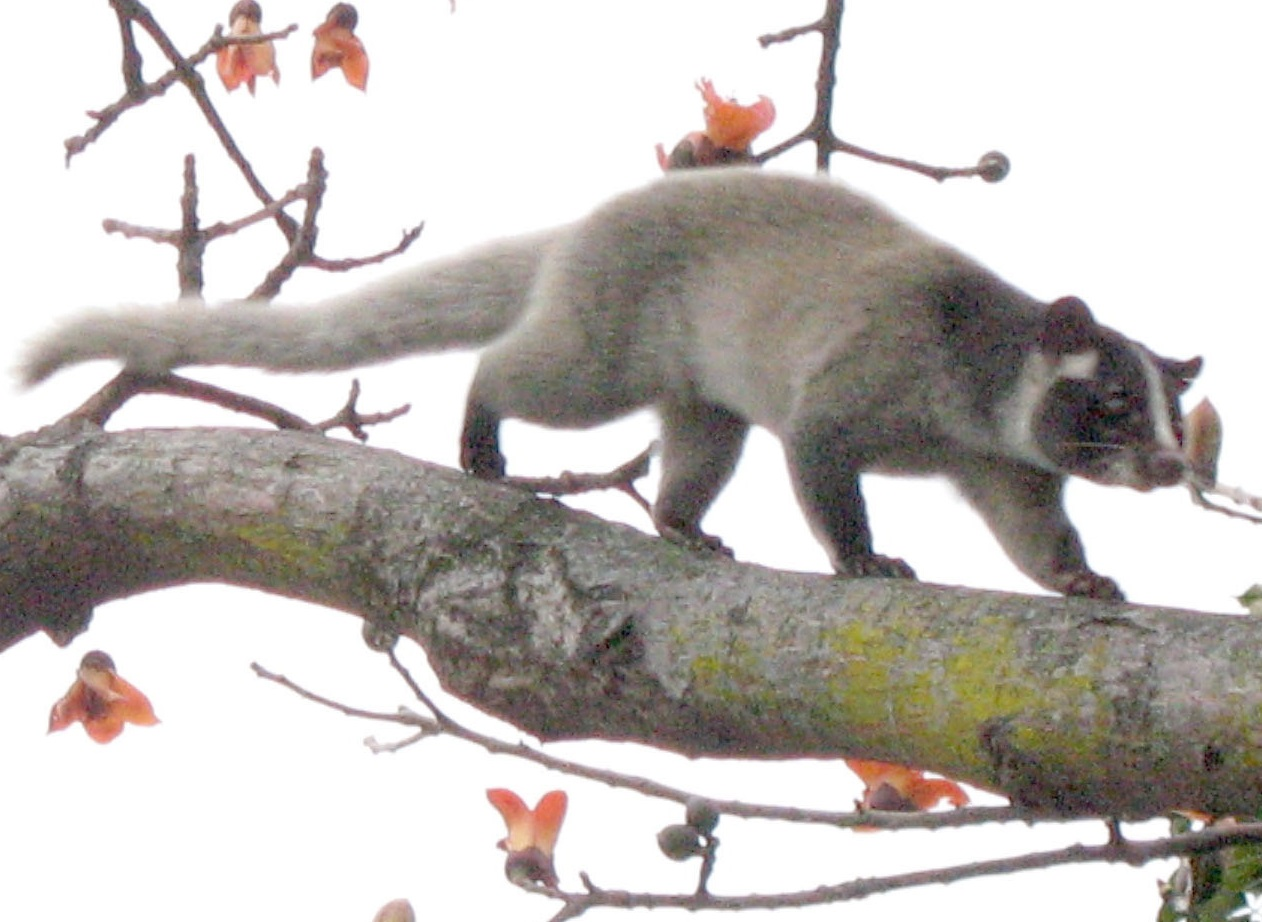

Conservation status
- Least Concern (IUCN 3.1)
- CITES Appendix III

Scientific classification
- Kingdom: Animalia
- Phylum: Chordata
- Class: Mammalia
- Order: Carnivora
- Family: Viverridae
- Subfamily: Paradoxurinae
- Genus: Paguma; Gray, 1831
- Species: P. larvata

Binomial name
- Paguma larvata (Smith, 1827)
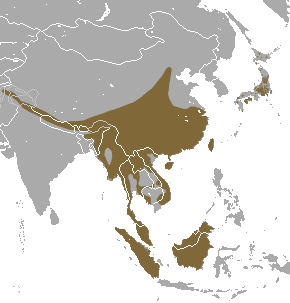
- Masked palm civet range

= Masked palm civet =

Species of carnivore

The masked palm civet (Paguma larvata), also called the gem-faced civet or Himalayan palm civet, is a viverrid species native to the Indian subcontinent and Southeast Asia. It has been listed as least concern on the IUCN Red List since 2008 as it occurs in many protected areas, is tolerant to some degree of habitat modification, and widely distributed with presumed large populations that are unlikely to be declining.

The genus Paguma was first named and described by John Edward Gray in 1831. All described forms are regarded as a single species.

In 2003, masked palm civets at a wildlife market in China were found to have been infected with the severe acute respiratory syndrome coronavirus.

== Taxonomy ==
The genus name Paguma was first proposed and described by John Edward Gray in 1831. Reginald Innes Pocock thought the genus comprises two species, namely:

- P. lanigera in northern Nepal and Tibet and
- P. larvata with eight subspecies from the Himalayan foothills to southern China, Southeast Asia up to Indonesia.

== Characteristics ==
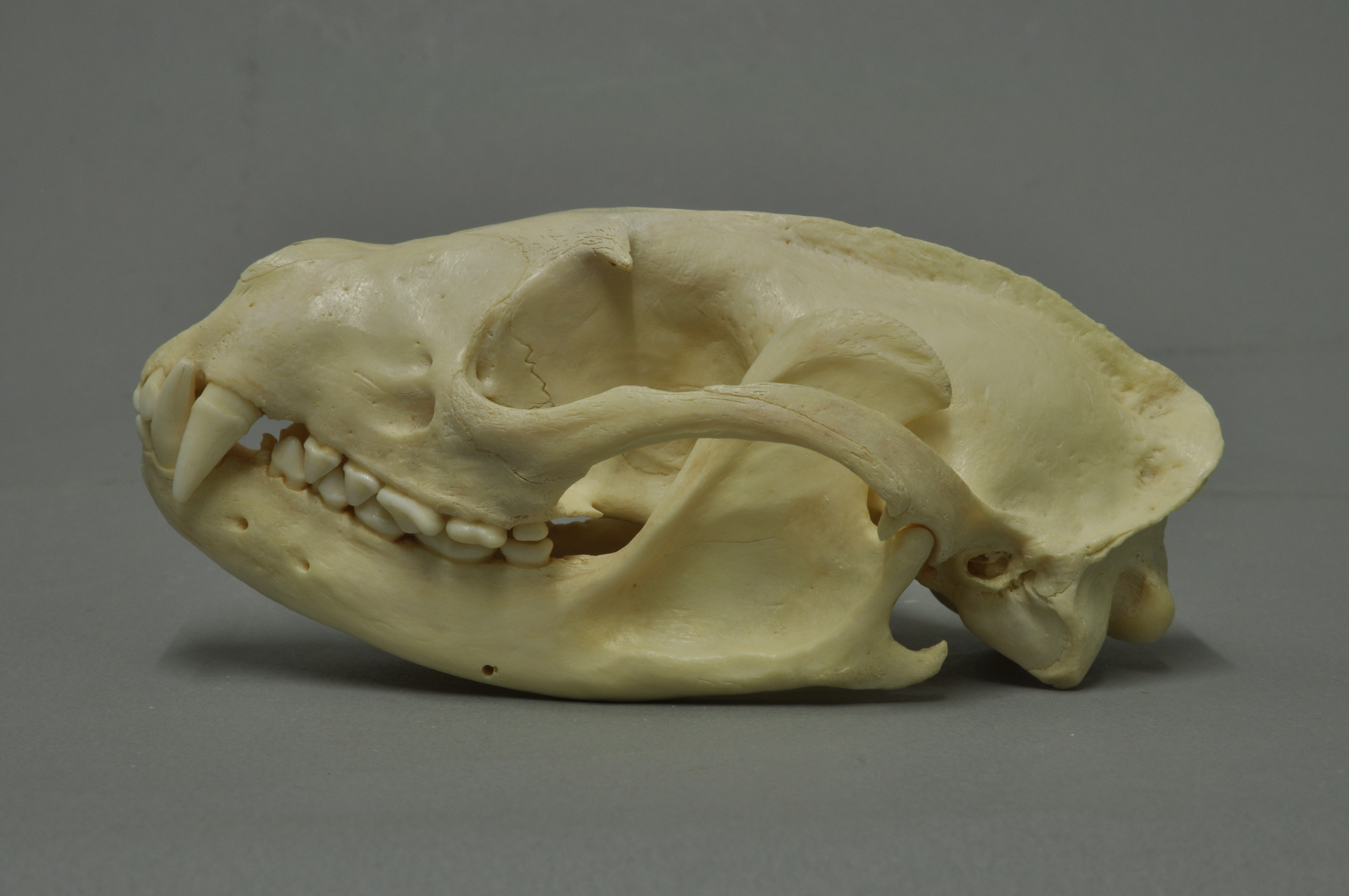
Skull of a masked palm civet

The masked palm civet's fur is grayish to ochraceous, black on the head, shoulders and neck, and blackish brown on the tail and feet. It has a white blaze on the forehead; white marks above and below the eyes extend to the ears, forming a half-collar. In morphology the masked palm civet resembles other palm civets, but does not have spots or stripes. Its tail is more than two-thirds the length of head and body. It has two pairs of mammae.

The whitish mask extends laterally to the far edges of the cheeks and caudally up the forehead, past the ears, and down the back of the neck before stopping just under the shoulder blades. The eyes are surrounded by white fur that can vary from faint, incomplete outlines to well-defined blotches. The lips, chin, and throat are white. In some, white stripes of fur, comparable to sideburns on humans due to shape and location, curve up from the throat. These curves vary in thickness and have ends that terminate either in small blotches at the ear base or large blotches that surround the base of both darkly furred ears.

The species having a large repartition, differences in morphological parameters can be observable in different populations. Adults of this species usually have a body length of 50 to 60 cm (20 to 24 in), a tail measuring 40 to 50 cm (16 to 20 in) and a weight between 3 and 5 kg (6.6 and 11.0 lb), although some adults can be lighter or heavier (see table below).

Basic morphometrics values of adults Paguma larvata geographically
Attribute	Japan (Kase et al., 2011) (Females; n = 4)	Japan (Kase et al., 2011) (Males; n = 2)	China (Zhou et al., 2014) (Females; n = 17)	China (Zhou et al., 2014) (Males; n = 16)	Thailand (Chutipong et al., 2015) (Females; n = 2)	Thailand (Chutipong et al., 2015) (Males; n = 1)
Weight (kg)	2.5–3.3	2.9–3.4	4.20	4.24	3.4–5.2	6.2
Total Length (cm)	94.0–101.0	99.0–102.0	-	-	-	-
Head-Body Length (cm)	53.0–58.0	56.0–57.0	53.60	53.88	-	-
Tail Length (cm)	-	-	47.89	48.68	-	-

== Distribution and habitat ==
The masked palm civet is distributed from the northern parts of the Indian subcontinent, especially the Himalayas, ranging eastwards across Bhutan, Bangladesh, Myanmar, Thailand, Peninsular Malaysia, Laos, Cambodia, Vietnam to China, Borneo, Sumatra, Taiwan, and the Andaman and Nicobar islands. It has been recorded in both evergreen and deciduous forest, and in disturbed habitat. It also inhabits fragmented forest habitats, albeit at reduced density.

Results of a genetic study indicate that the masked palm civet is not native to Japan, but that it was introduced multiple times over centuries; at least two introductions were from Taiwan.

== Ecology and behaviour ==
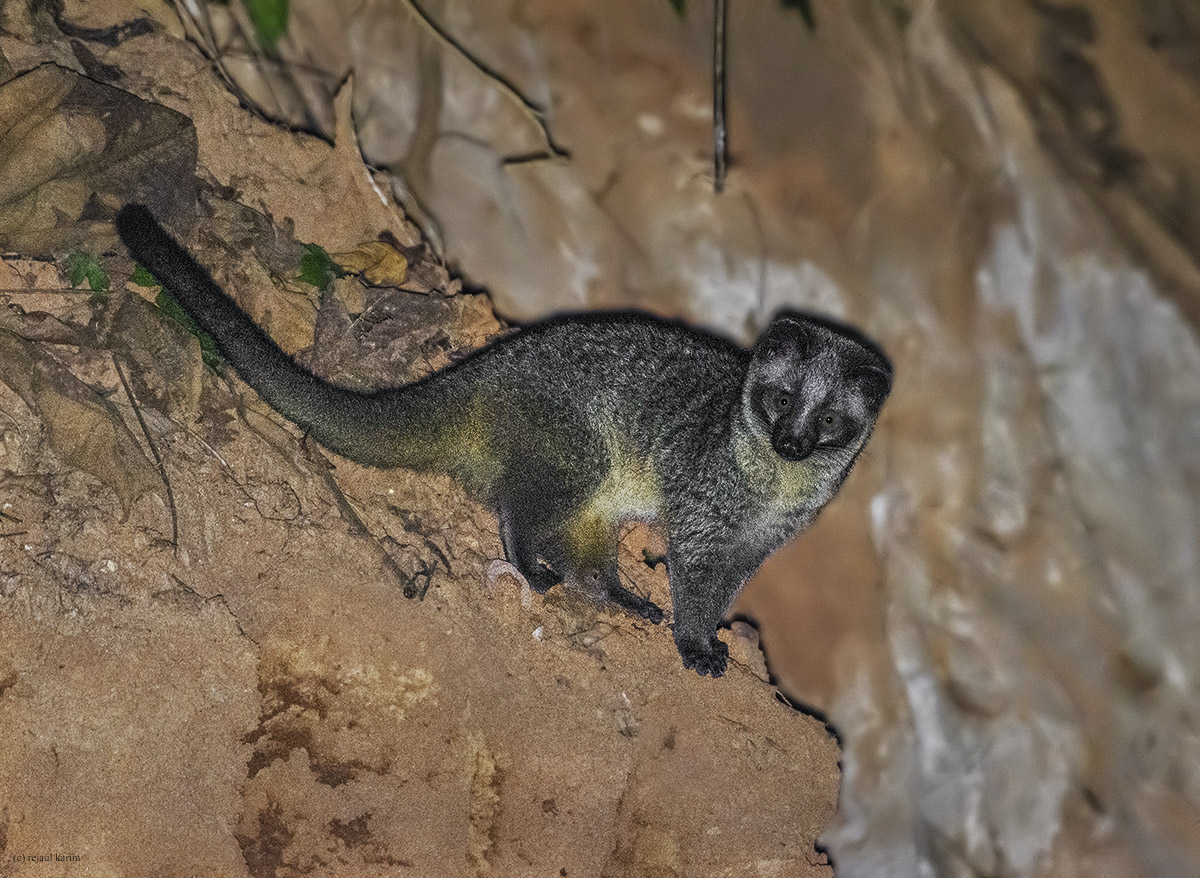
Masked palm civet in Assam

The masked palm civet is a nocturnal solitary predator that is occasionally active during the day. It is partly arboreal.

When alarmed, the masked palm civet sprays a secretion from its anal gland to deter predators.

=== Feeding and diet ===
The masked palm civet is an omnivore feeding on rats and birds as well as on fruit such as figs, mangoes, bananas, and leaves. Scat analysis indicates that they also eat mollusks, arthropods, bark and to a lesser extent snakes and frogs. The composition of the diet varies between seasons and sites.

=== Reproduction ===
Masked palm civets are polyestrous and their mating behavior is promiscuous. There are two breeding seasons per year. The female bears up to four young. Masked palm civets are known to reach 15 years of age in captivity.

Copulation in masked palm civets can last for more than 30 minutes. Upon completion of copulation, males leave a mating plug in the female's vaginal tract. The young grow to the size of an adult in about three months.

== Threats ==
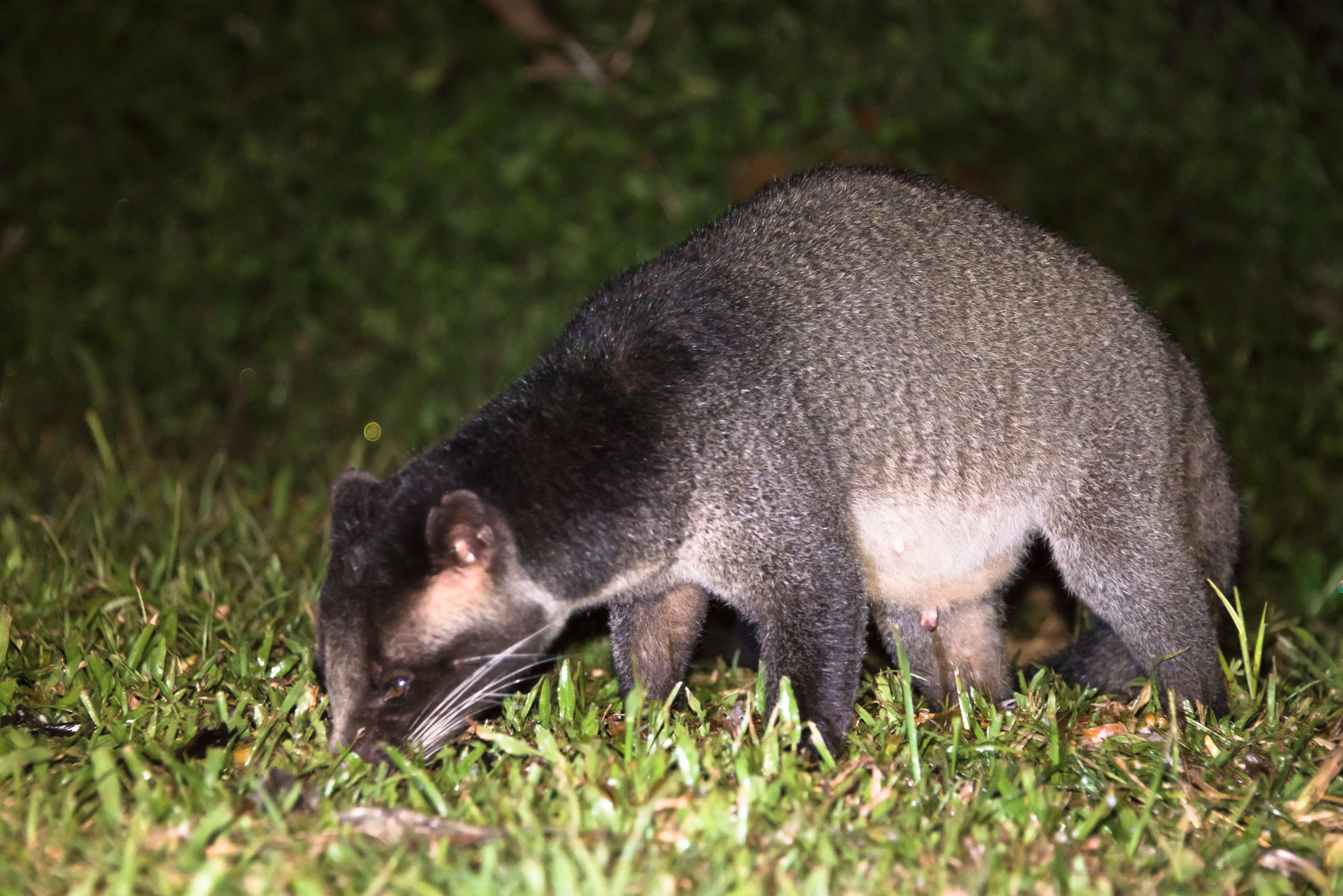
Masked palm civet in Kaeng Krachan National Park

The major threats for the masked palm civet are continued habitat destruction and hunting for bushmeat. It is widely offered in restaurants in southern China and is also eaten in Vietnam. Masked palm civets are often victims of illegal animal trafficking to meet the demands in China and Vietnam; 100 individuals were confiscated in April 2021 and at least eight individuals died due to stress and injuries.

== Conservation ==
Paguma larvata is protected in Malaysia and China, but not Thailand and Nepal. The population of India is listed on CITES Appendix III.

== Connection with SARS ==
In May 2003, the SARS virus was isolated in several masked palm civets found in a wildlife market in Guangdong, China. Evidence of virus infection was also detected in other animals including a raccoon dog, and in humans working at the same market. In 2006, scientists from the Chinese Centre for Disease Control and Prevention of the University of Hong Kong and the Guangzhou Centre for Disease Control and Prevention established a direct genetic link between the SARS coronavirus appearing in civets and humans, bearing out claims that the disease had jumped across species.
