= Lufeng, Yunnan =

Lufeng 禄丰市
- County-level city
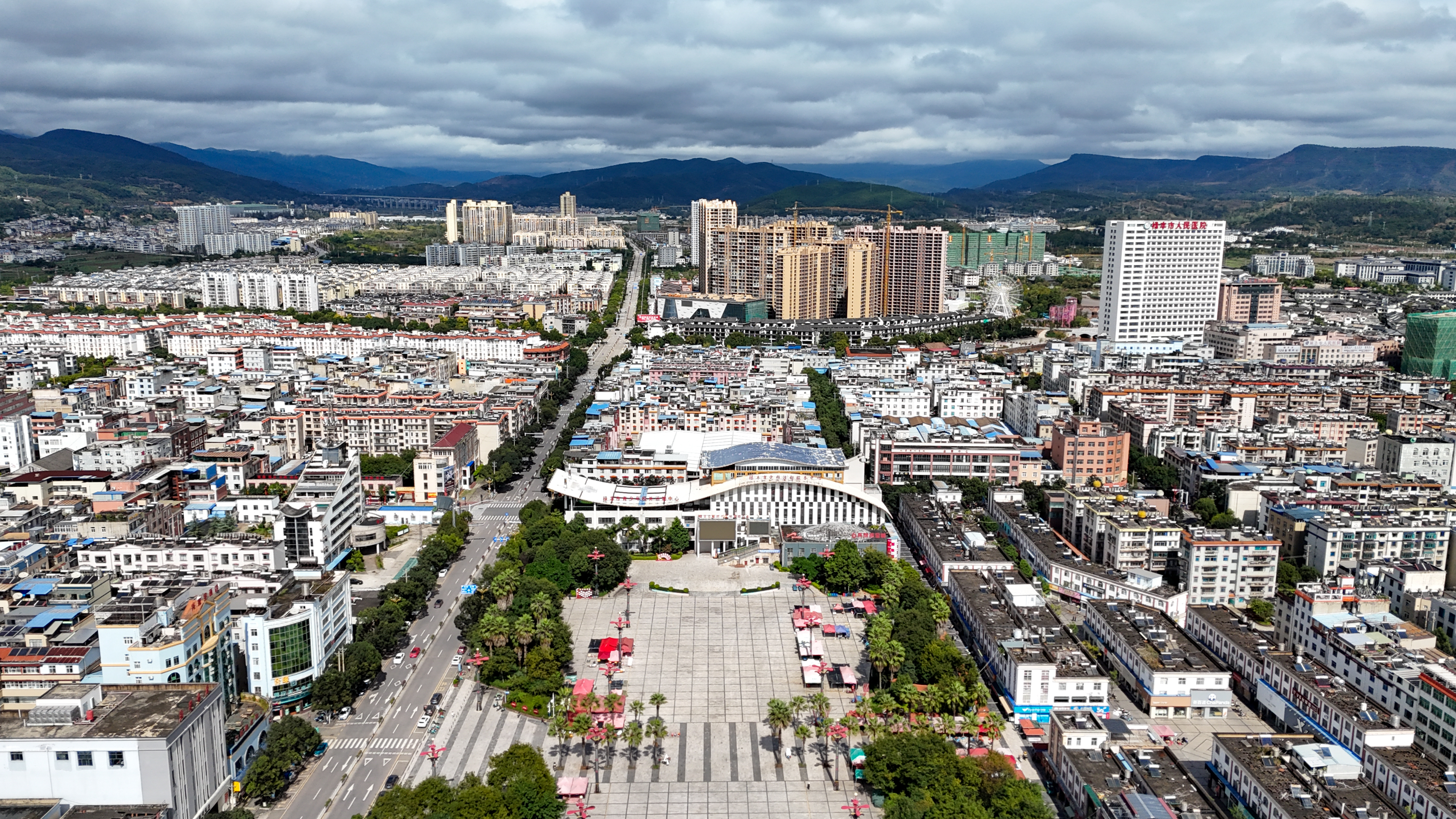
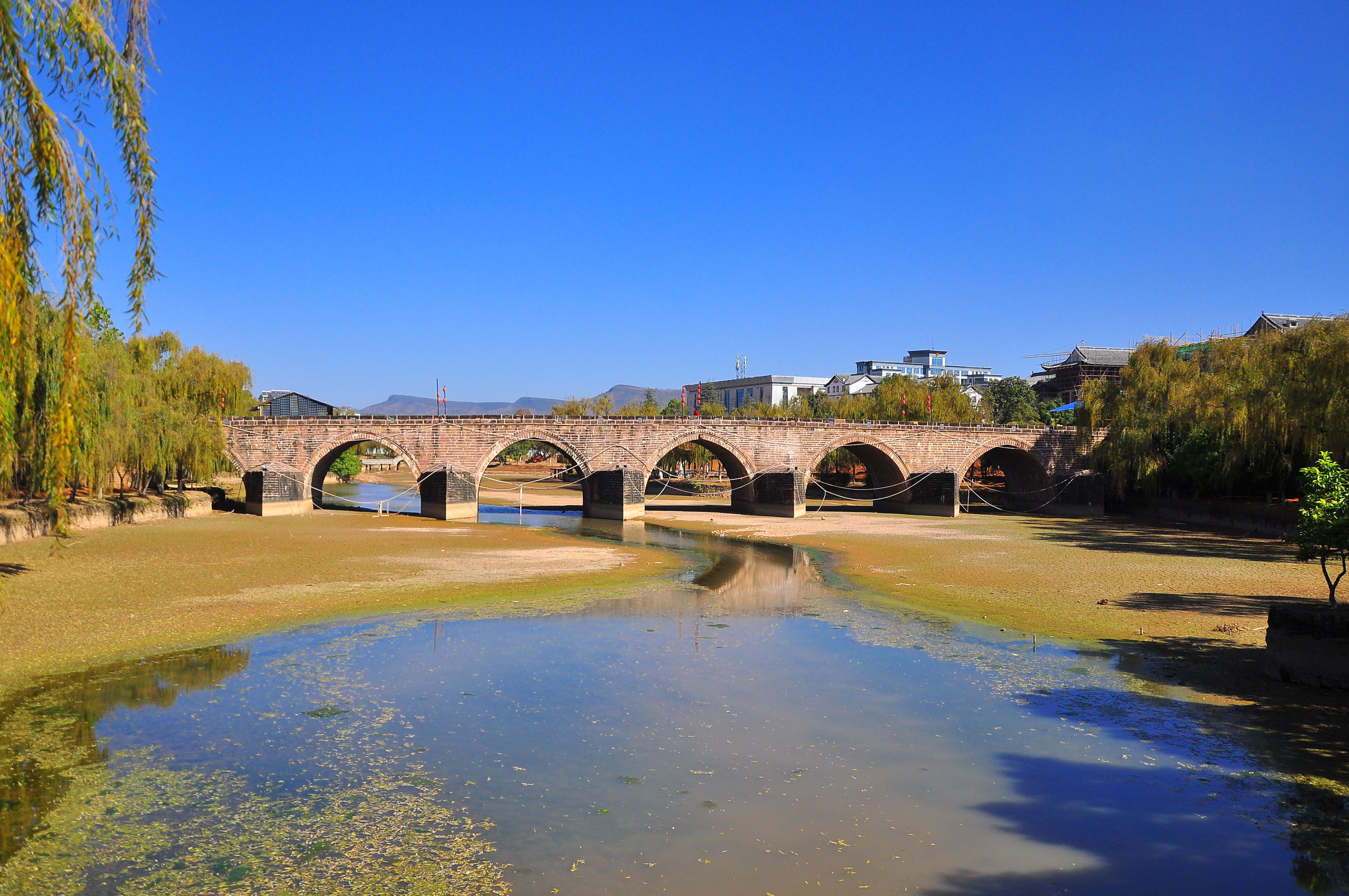
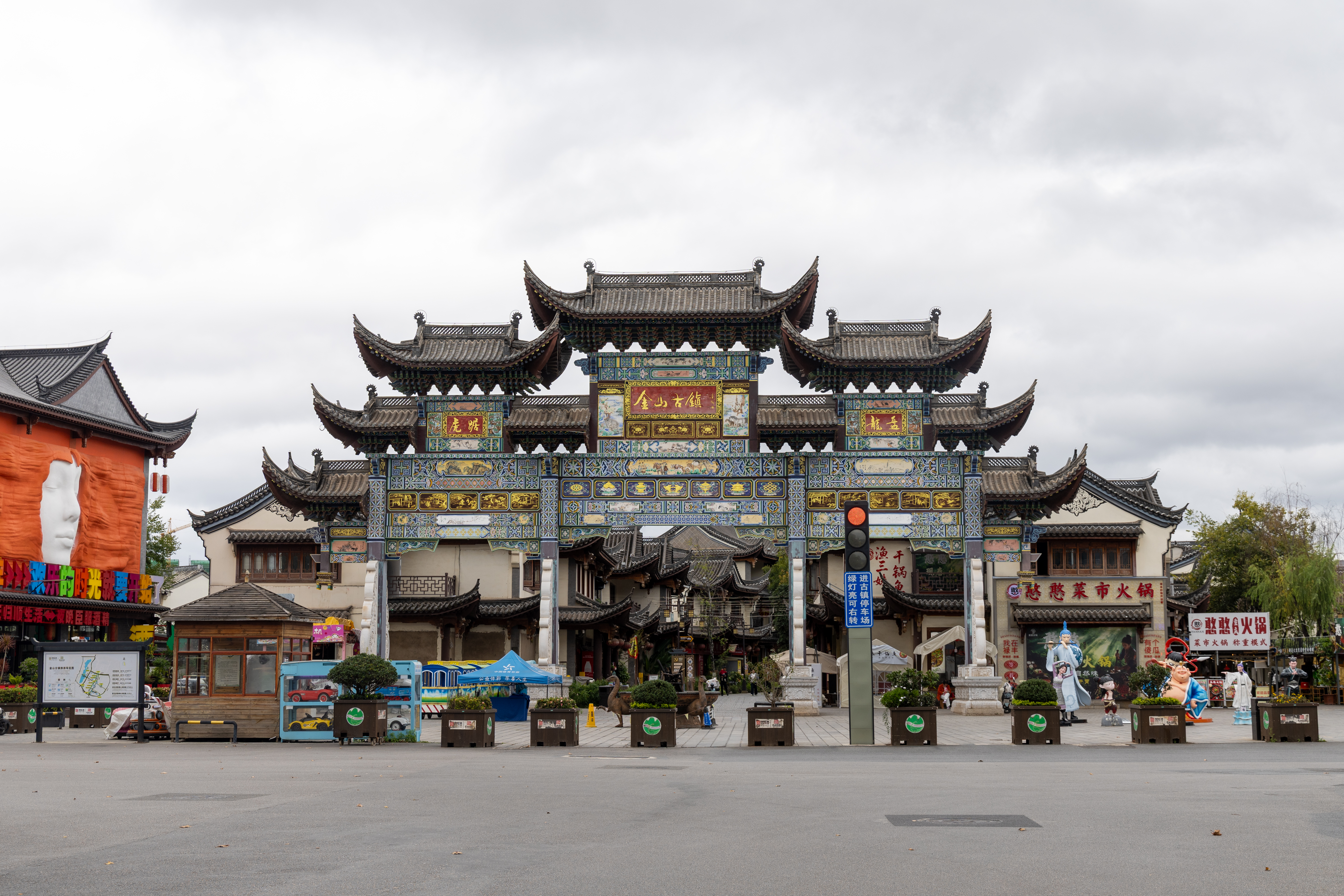
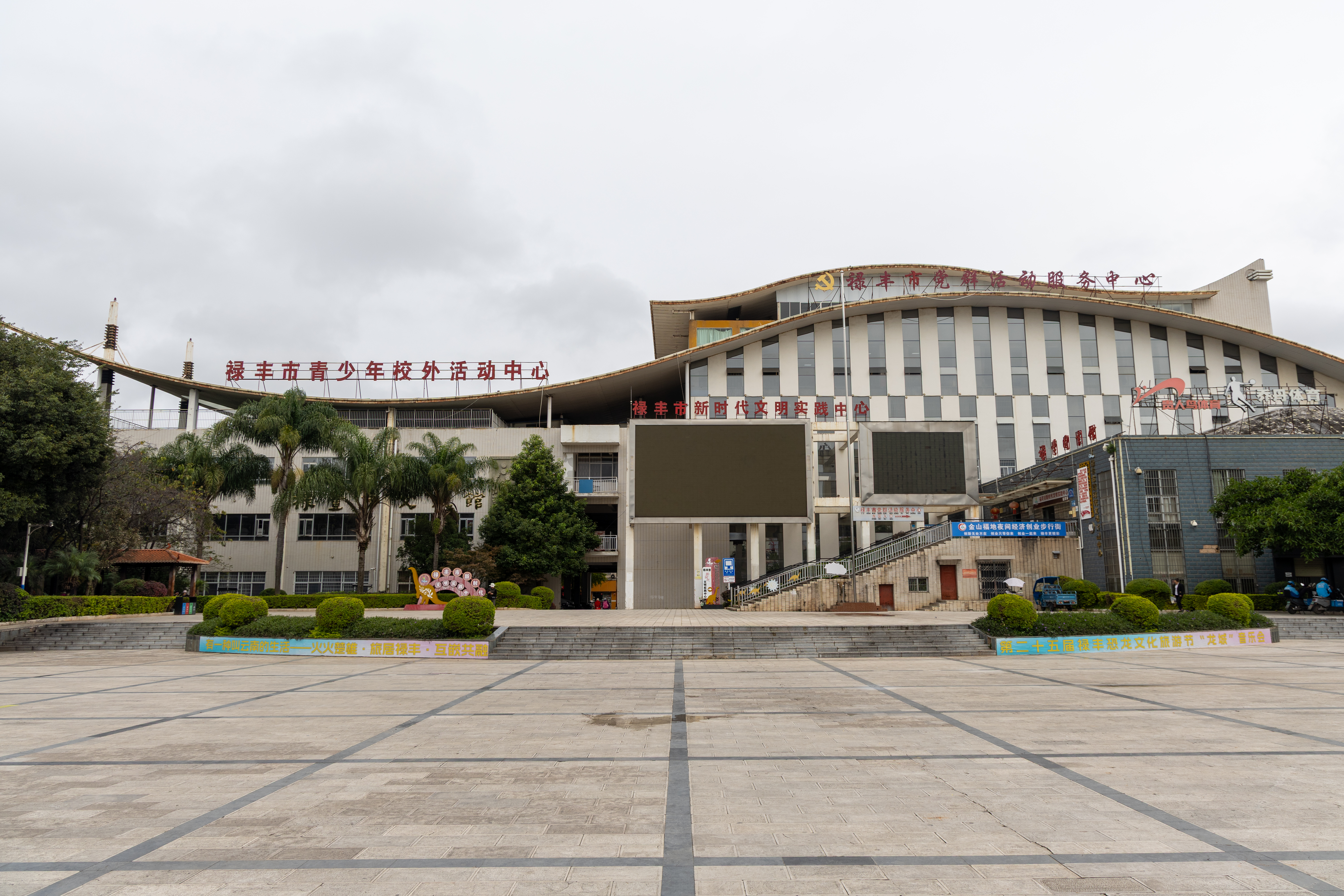
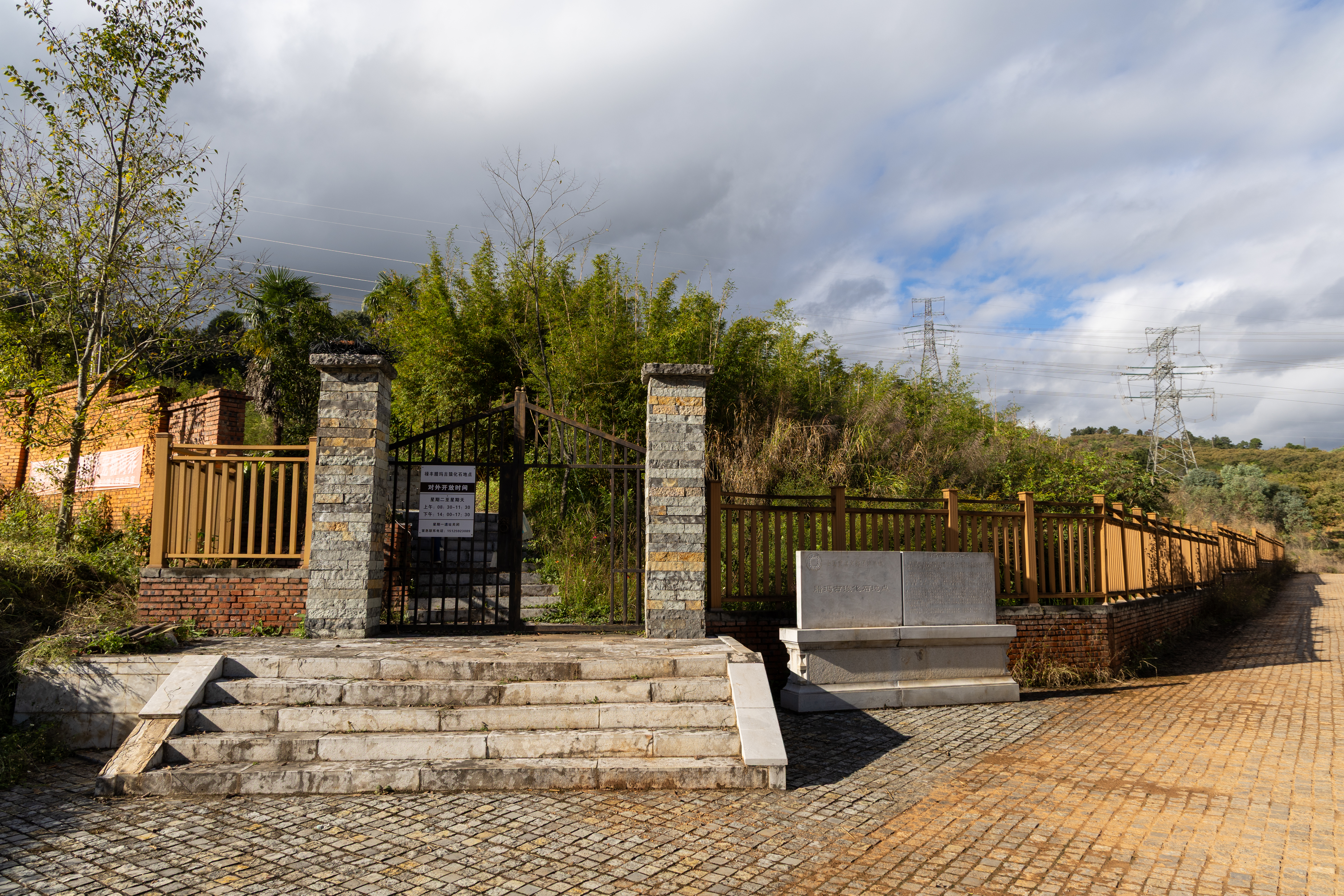
- Skyline of Lufeng Xingxiu Bridge Jinshan Old Town Century Square Ramapithecus fossil site

- Location of Lufeng City in Chuxiong Prefecture within Yunnan province

- Location of the seat in Yunnan
- Coordinates: 25°08′51″N 101°58′35″E
- Country: People's Republic of China
- Province: Yunnan
- Autonomous prefecture: Chuxiong

Area
  - Total: 3,536 km^{2} (1,365 sq mi)

Population
  - Total: 414,261
  - Density: 117.2/km^{2} (303.4/sq mi)
- Time zone: UTC+8 (CST)
- Postal code: 651200
- Area code: 0878
- Website: www.lufeng.gov.cn

Lufeng (simplified Chinese: 禄丰; traditional Chinese: 祿豐; pinyin: Lùfēng; Chuxiong Yi script:, IPA：/lu^{21} bə^{33} lu^{21}/) is a county-level city located in Yunnan province, China, administered as a part of Chuxiong Yi Autonomous Prefecture.

== Geography ==
Lufeng is located in the east of Chuxiong Prefecture in central Yunnan. It borders Fumin County, Xishan District and Anning, Yunnan to the east, Shuangbai County and Yimen County to the south, Chuxiong City and Mouding County to the west, and Yuanmou County and Wuding County to the north.

== Administrative divisions ==
Lufeng County has 11 towns and 3 townships.

11 towns

- Jinshan (金山镇)
- Renxing (仁兴镇)
- Bicheng (碧城镇)
- Qinfeng (勤丰镇)
- Yipinglang (一平浪镇)
- Guangtong (广通镇)
- Heijing (黑井镇)
- Tuguan (土官镇)
- Caiyun (彩云镇)
- Heping (和平镇)
- Konglongshan (恐龙山镇)

3 townships

- Zhongcun (中村乡)
- Gaofeng (高峰乡)
- Tuo'an (妥安乡)

== Ethnic groups ==
The Lufeng County Gazetteer (1997:114) lists the following ethnic Yi subgroups.

- Luoluopu 倮罗濮 (exonym: Black Yi 黑彝): in Luochuan 罗川, Chuanjie 川街, Jinshan 金山, Zhongcun Jila 中村叽拉, Jiuzhuang Xinmin 旧庄新民, Qinfeng Yangxichong 勤丰洋溪冲
  - Xiaohechong Yi subgroup 小河冲彝族 (autonym: Luoluo 罗罗)
- Nasupu 纳苏濮 (exonym: Red Yi 红彝, Luowu 罗武): in Zhongcun Ale 中村阿勒, Eshan 峨山, Shanqian 山前; Shezi Nadun 舍资纳甸, Qizai 杞栽, Mabaoshao 马保哨, Sanjia 三家
- Gaisipu 改斯濮 (exonym: White Yi 白彝): in Gaofeng 髙峰, Tuo'an 妥安, Heijing 黑井, Guangtong 广通, etc.
- Michapu 米切濮 (exonym: Micha 密岔族)

== Climate ==
Climate data for Lufeng, elevation 1,566 m (5,138 ft), (1991–2020 normals, extremes 1981–2010)
Month	Jan	Feb	Mar	Apr	May	Jun	Jul	Aug	Sep	Oct	Nov	Dec	Year
Record high °C (°F)	25.7 (78.3)	27.7 (81.9)	31.5 (88.7)	32.7 (90.9)	33.7 (92.7)	33.0 (91.4)	32.8 (91.0)	32.2 (90.0)	32.3 (90.1)	29.7 (85.5)	27.6 (81.7)	24.8 (76.6)	33.7 (92.7)
Mean daily maximum °C (°F)	18.3 (64.9)	21.1 (70.0)	24.0 (75.2)	27.1 (80.8)	27.7 (81.9)	27.6 (81.7)	27.1 (80.8)	27.1 (80.8)	26.0 (78.8)	23.7 (74.7)	20.6 (69.1)	17.9 (64.2)	24.0 (75.2)
Daily mean °C (°F)	8.7 (47.7)	11.2 (52.2)	14.5 (58.1)	18.2 (64.8)	20.8 (69.4)	22.1 (71.8)	21.8 (71.2)	21.2 (70.2)	19.8 (67.6)	17.3 (63.1)	12.7 (54.9)	9.2 (48.6)	16.5 (61.6)
Mean daily minimum °C (°F)	1.2 (34.2)	2.3 (36.1)	5.5 (41.9)	9.5 (49.1)	14.8 (58.6)	17.8 (64.0)	18.3 (64.9)	17.4 (63.3)	16.0 (60.8)	13.3 (55.9)	7.5 (45.5)	3.2 (37.8)	10.6 (51.0)
Record low °C (°F)	−4.2 (24.4)	−3.7 (25.3)	−2.4 (27.7)	1.2 (34.2)	6.2 (43.2)	11.1 (52.0)	13.0 (55.4)	11.1 (52.0)	6.4 (43.5)	4.9 (40.8)	−4.4 (24.1)	−5.5 (22.1)	−5.5 (22.1)
Average precipitation mm (inches)	14.0 (0.55)	13.3 (0.52)	16.1 (0.63)	24.8 (0.98)	78.6 (3.09)	163.1 (6.42)	202.5 (7.97)	178.0 (7.01)	110.1 (4.33)	78.2 (3.08)	32.4 (1.28)	8.5 (0.33)	919.6 (36.19)
Average precipitation days (≥ 0.1 mm)	3.7	3.5	5.0	5.9	10.8	15.0	19.7	18.9	14.3	11.3	5.5	3.5	117.1
Average snowy days	0.3	0	0.1	0	0	0	0	0	0	0	0	0.1	0.5
Average relative humidity (%)	74	65	61	60	67	78	83	84	83	82	80	79	75
Mean monthly sunshine hours	206.6	219.1	240.9	252.0	211.7	151.3	121.3	141.5	129.4	141.5	166.5	170.9	2,152.7
Percentage possible sunshine	62	68	65	66	51	37	29	35	35	40	51	52	49
Source: China Meteorological Administration
