= Tonghua County =

Tonghua County 通化县
- County
- Tonghua County (red) in Tonghua (yellow)

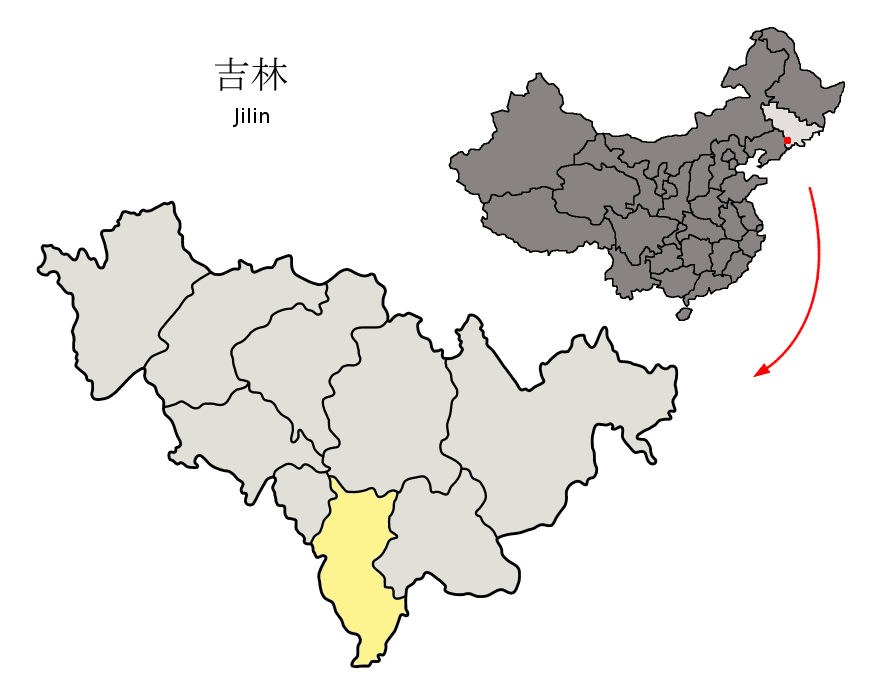
- Tonghua City in Jilin
- Coordinates: 41°40′47″N 125°45′33″E
- Country: People's Republic of China
- Province: Jilin
- Prefecture-level city: Tonghua
- Elevation: 468 m (1,535 ft)
- Time zone: UTC+8 (China Standard)

Tonghua County (simplified Chinese: 通化县; traditional Chinese: 通化縣; pinyin: Tōnghuà Xiàn) is a county in the southwest of Jilin province, China, bordering Liaoning province to the west. It has a total area of 3,729 square kilometres (1,440 sq mi) and population of 250,000.

== Administrative divisions ==
Towns:

- Kuaidamao (快大茂镇), Guosong (果松镇), Ermi (二密镇), Ying'ebu (英额布镇), Xinglin (兴林镇), Sankeyushu (三棵榆树镇), Jiangdian (江甸镇), Shihu (石湖镇), Guanghua (光华镇), Da'an (大安镇)

Townships:

- Fujiang Township (富江乡), Donglai Township (东来乡), Sipeng Township (四棚乡), Daquanyuan Manchu and Korean Ethnic Township (大泉源满族朝鲜族乡), Jindou Korean and Manchu Ethnic Township (金斗朝鲜族满族乡)

== Climate ==
Climate data for Tonghua County, elevation 380 m (1,250 ft), (1991–2020 normals, extremes 1981–present)
Month	Jan	Feb	Mar	Apr	May	Jun	Jul	Aug	Sep	Oct	Nov	Dec	Year
Record high °C (°F)	4.1 (39.4)	11.1 (52.0)	23.2 (73.8)	28.5 (83.3)	32.1 (89.8)	34.5 (94.1)	36.8 (98.2)	37.7 (99.9)	30.1 (86.2)	27.3 (81.1)	17.2 (63.0)	7.7 (45.9)	37.7 (99.9)
Mean daily maximum °C (°F)	−6.2 (20.8)	−1.8 (28.8)	5.3 (41.5)	14.5 (58.1)	21.8 (71.2)	25.4 (77.7)	27.6 (81.7)	27.0 (80.6)	22.6 (72.7)	15.0 (59.0)	3.9 (39.0)	−4.9 (23.2)	12.5 (54.5)
Daily mean °C (°F)	−16.1 (3.0)	−10.9 (12.4)	−1.8 (28.8)	7.1 (44.8)	14.3 (57.7)	19.0 (66.2)	22.1 (71.8)	20.8 (69.4)	14.4 (57.9)	6.4 (43.5)	−3.0 (26.6)	−13.1 (8.4)	4.9 (40.9)
Mean daily minimum °C (°F)	−23.5 (−10.3)	−18.6 (−1.5)	−8.3 (17.1)	0.3 (32.5)	7.3 (45.1)	13.7 (56.7)	18.2 (64.8)	16.9 (62.4)	9.2 (48.6)	0.1 (32.2)	−8.4 (16.9)	−19.5 (−3.1)	−1.1 (30.1)
Record low °C (°F)	−42.3 (−44.1)	−35.8 (−32.4)	−30.1 (−22.2)	−12.5 (9.5)	−3.7 (25.3)	3.2 (37.8)	9.6 (49.3)	4.5 (40.1)	−4.5 (23.9)	−10.5 (13.1)	−24.6 (−12.3)	−34.4 (−29.9)	−42.3 (−44.1)
Average precipitation mm (inches)	6.9 (0.27)	12.3 (0.48)	21.1 (0.83)	46.3 (1.82)	79.0 (3.11)	116.2 (4.57)	185.7 (7.31)	196.8 (7.75)	64.9 (2.56)	48.5 (1.91)	36.2 (1.43)	12.1 (0.48)	826 (32.52)
Average precipitation days (≥ 0.1 mm)	6.9	5.9	7.7	9.7	13.0	14.9	15.5	14.9	9.5	9.4	9.5	8.4	125.3
Average snowy days	10.1	8.7	9.3	3.4	0	0	0	0	0	1.8	8.8	11.2	53.3
Average relative humidity (%)	71	69	64	59	66	76	83	86	82	74	75	74	73
Mean monthly sunshine hours	174.2	182.3	211.7	211.2	229.4	201.0	176.0	177.9	188.3	189.3	148.0	145.5	2,234.8
Percentage possible sunshine	59	61	57	53	51	44	38	42	51	56	51	51	51
Source: China Meteorological Administrationall-time July and extreme (August) temperature All-time Oct extreme
