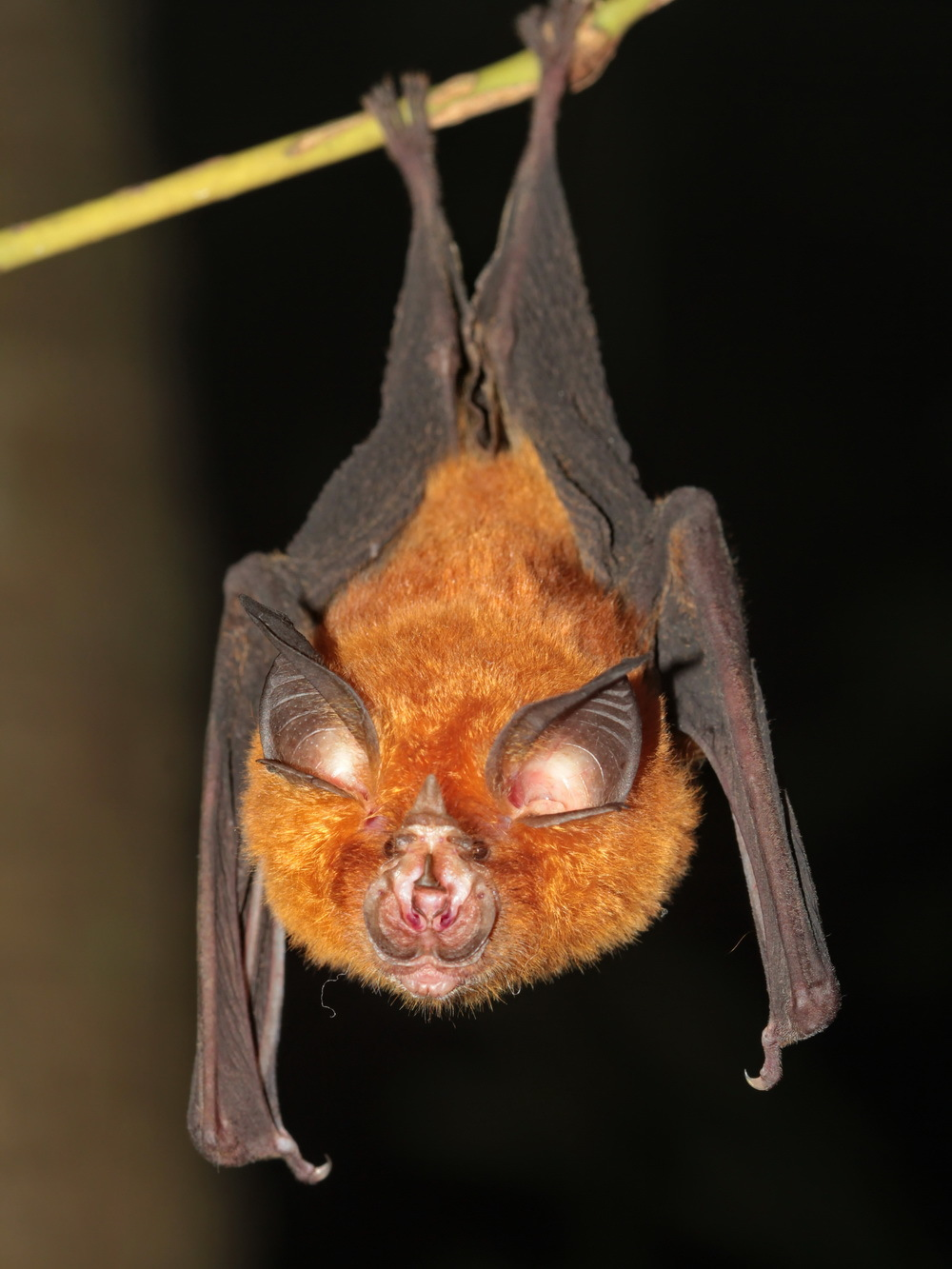

Conservation status
- Least Concern (IUCN 3.1)

Scientific classification
- Kingdom: Animalia
- Phylum: Chordata
- Class: Mammalia
- Order: Chiroptera
- Family: Rhinolophidae
- Genus: Rhinolophus
- Species: R. affinis

Binomial name
- Rhinolophus affinis Horsfield, 1823

Subspecies
- Nine; see text
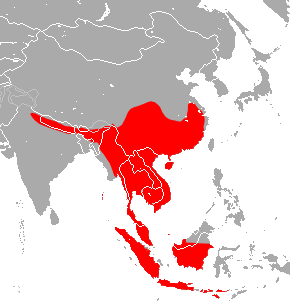
- Intermediate Horseshoe bat range

= Intermediate horseshoe bat =

Species of bat

The intermediate horseshoe bat (Rhinolophus affinis) is a bat species of the family Rhinolophidae ("nose crest") that is very widespread throughout much of the Indian subcontinent, southern and central China and Southeast Asia. It is listed by IUCN as Least Concern as it is considered common where it occurs, without any known major threats.

== Taxonomy ==
The intermediate horseshoe bat was described as a new species in 1823 by American naturalist Thomas Horsfield. The holotype was collected on the Indonesian island of Java.

Rhinolophus affinis is divided into the following nine subspecies:

- R. a. affinis
- R. a. andamanensis
- R. a. hainanus
- R. a. himalayanus
- R. a. macrurus
- R. a. nesites
- R. a. princes
- R. a. superans
- R. a. tener

It varies in appearance and echolocation characteristics throughout its range, suggesting that this taxon may represent a species complex of closely related species.

== Description ==
The intermediate horseshoe bat has a total length of 58–63 mm (2.3–2.5 in), with a forearm length of 46–56 mm (1.8–2.2 in). Individuals weigh approximately 12–15 g (0.42–0.53 oz).

== Distribution ==
The intermediate horseshoe bat is widely distributed throughout Asia, occurring from India and China throughout Southeast Asia. It is found in Bangladesh, Bhutan, Brunei, Cambodia, China, India, Indonesia, Malaysia, Myanmar, Nepal, Thailand, and Vietnam. The easternmost extent of its range are the Indonesian Lesser Sunda Islands and Java. It is found at elevations from 290–2,000 m (950–6,560 ft) above sea level.
