= RacCS203 =

Virus classification
- (unranked): Virus
- Realm: Riboviria
- Kingdom: Orthornavirae
- Phylum: Pisuviricota
- Class: Pisoniviricetes
- Order: Nidovirales
- Family: Coronaviridae
- Genus: Betacoronavirus
- Subgenus: Sarbecovirus
- Species: Betacoronavirus pandemicum
- Strain: RacCS203

RacCS203 is a bat-derived strain of severe acute respiratory syndrome–related coronavirus collected in acuminate horseshoe bats from sites in Thailand and sequenced by Lin-Fa Wang's team. It has 91.5% sequence similarity to SARS-CoV-2 and is most related to the RmYN02 strain. Its spike protein is closely related to RmYN02's spike, both highly divergent from SARS-CoV-2's spike.

== Phylogenetics ==
=== Phylogenetic tree ===
A phylogenetic tree based on whole-genome sequences of SARS-CoV-2 and related coronaviruses is:

- SARS‑CoV‑2 related coronavirus
  - (Bat) Rc-o319, 81% to SARS-CoV-2, Rhinolophus cornutus, Iwate, Japan
  - - - Bat SL-ZXC21, 88% to SARS-CoV-2, Rhinolophus pusillus, Zhoushan, Zhejiang
      - Bat SL-ZC45, 88% to SARS-CoV-2, Rhinolophus pusillus, Zhoushan, Zhejiang
    - - Pangolin SARSr-CoV-GX, 85.3% to SARS-CoV-2, Manis javanica, smuggled from Southeast Asia
      - - Pangolin SARSr-CoV-GD, 90.1% to SARS-CoV-2, Manis javanica, smuggled from Southeast Asia
        - - - Bat RshSTT182, 92.6% to SARS-CoV-2, Rhinolophus shameli, Steung Treng, Cambodia
            - Bat RshSTT200, 92.6% to SARS-CoV-2, Rhinolophus shameli, Steung Treng, Cambodia
          - - (Bat) RacCS203, 91.5% to SARS-CoV-2, Rhinolophus acuminatus, Chachoengsao, Thailand
            - (Bat) RmYN02, 93.3% to SARS-CoV-2, Rhinolophus malayanus, Mengla, Yunnan
          - (Bat) RpYN06, 94.4% to SARS-CoV-2, Rhinolophus pusillus, Xishuangbanna, Yunnan
          - - (Bat) RaTG13, 96.1% to SARS-CoV-2, Rhinolophus affinis, Mojiang, Yunnan
            - (Bat) BANAL-52, 96.8% to SARS-CoV-2, Rhinolophus malayanus, Vientiane, Laos
            - SARS-CoV-2
- SARS-CoV-1, 79% to SARS-CoV-2

=== Genome comparison ===
SARS-CoV-2 compared to other SARSr-CoV (by nucleotide %)													
Strain	Full-length genome	ORF1ab	S	RBM	ORF3a	E	M	ORF6	ORF7a	ORF7b	ORF8	N	ORF10
RaTG13	96.10%	96.50%	92.30%	86.30%	96.30%	99.60%	95.50%	98.40%	95.60%	99.20%	97.00%	96.90%	99.20%
RmYN02	93.60%	97.10%	72.50%	61.90%	96.40%	98.70%	94.80%	96.80%	96.20%	91.00%	48.70%	97.30%	99.20%
RacCS203	91.50%	94.30%	71.30%	61.60%	91.90%	99.10%	94.60%	96.20%	92.40%	93.90%	91.60%	93.20%	99.20%
GD/1/2019	90.20%	90.20%	83.70%	86.90%	93.20%	99.10%	93.30%	95.70%	93.40%	91.70%	92.10%	96.20%	99.20%
SL-ZC45	87.70%	89.00%	75.50%	62.50%	87.80%	98.70%	93.40%	94.60%	88.80%	94.70%	88.50%	91.10%	99.20%
SL-ZXC21	87.50%	88.70%	74.90%	61.60%	88.90%	98.70%	93.40%	94.60%	89.10%	95.50%	88.50%	91.20%	99.20%
GX-P4L	85.40%	84.80%	83.60%	80.00%	86.80%	97.40%	91.30%	90.90%	86.60%	83.50%	81.30%	91.00%	88.90%
GX-P5L	85.20%	84.60%	83.30%	79.90%	87.00%	97.40%	91.30%	90.90%	86.40%	83.50%	80.70%	91.00%	94.00%
SARS-CoV	79.30%	79.70%	72.30%	71.90%	75.30%	93.50%	85.50%	75.50%	82.10%	83.80%	45.80%	88.20%	93.20%
Rc-o319	79.20%	79.80%	72.20%	70.10%	83.30%	97.40%	86.60%	86.60%	78.40%	77.30%	52.30%	88.30%	94.90%

SARS-CoV-2 compared to other SARSr-CoV (by amino acid %)													
Strain	Full-length genome	ORF1ab	S	RBM	ORF3a	E	M	ORF6	ORF7a	ORF7b	ORF8	N	ORF10
RaTG13		98.50%	97.30%	90.10%	97.80%	100.00%	99.60%	100.00%	97.50%	97.70%	95.00%	99.10%	97.40%
RmYN02		98.80%	72.40%	63.20%	96.70%	100.00%	98.70%	96.70%	95.90%	83.70%	28.20%	98.60%	97.40%
RacCS203		97.30%	72.30%	63.70%	97.50%	100.00%	99.10%	98.40%	95.90%	93.00%	94.20%	95.70%	-
GD/1/2019		96.70%	90.00%	96.90%	97.10%	100.00%	98.70%	96.70%	97.50%	95.40%	95.00%	97.90%	97.40%
SL-ZC45		95.60%	80.20%	65.90%	90.90%	100.00%	98.70%	93.40%	87.60%	93.00%	94.20%	94.30%	97.40%
SL-ZXC21		95.20%	79.70%	65.90%	92.00%	100.00%	98.70%	93.40%	88.40%	93.00%	94.20%	94.30%	-
GX-P4L		92.50%	92.30%	86.60%	89.50%	100.00%	98.20%	95.10%	88.40%	-	87.60%	93.60%	73.70%
GX-P5L		92.50%	92.40%	86.60%	89.80%	100.00%	98.20%	95.10%	88.40%	72.10%	87.60%	93.80%	84.20%
SARS-CoV		86.10%	75.80%	73.10%	72.40%	94.70%	90.50%	67.20%	85.30%	81.40%	-	90.50%	81.60%
Rc-o319		87.60%	76.20%	73.50%	87.00%	98.70%	91.00%	83.60%	73.80%	69.80%	26.80%	89.50%	86.80%

== See also ==
- RaTG13, 96.2% similarity to SARS-COV-2
- RmYN02, 93.3% similarity to SARS-COV-2
