= RaTG13 =

BatCoV RaTG13

Virus classification
- (unranked): Virus
- Realm: Riboviria
- Kingdom: Orthornavirae
- Phylum: Pisuviricota
- Class: Pisoniviricetes
- Order: Nidovirales
- Family: Coronaviridae
- Genus: Betacoronavirus
- Subgenus: Sarbecovirus
- Species: Betacoronavirus pandemicum
- Strain: BatCoV RaTG13

Synonyms
- Bat coronavirus Ra4991

Close relative of SARS-CoV-2 discovered in 2013

Bat coronavirus RaTG13 is a SARS-like betacoronavirus identified in the droppings of the horseshoe bat Rhinolophus affinis. It was discovered in 2013 in bat droppings from a mining cave near the town of Tongguan in Mojiang county in Yunnan, China. In February 2020, it was identified as the closest known relative of SARS-CoV-2, the virus that causes COVID-19, sharing 96.1% nucleotide identity. However, in 2022, scientists found three closer matches in bats found 530 km south, in Feuang, Laos, designated as BANAL-52 (96.8% identity), BANAL-103 and BANAL-236.

== History ==
In the spring of 2012, three miners cleaning bat feces in an abandoned copper mine near the town of Tongguan in Mojiang Hani Autonomous County developed fatal pneumonia. Out of concerns that the miner's cases could represent a novel disease, serum samples collected from the miners were sent to the Wuhan Institute of Virology and tested by Shi Zhengli and her group for Ebola virus, Nipah virus, and bat SARSr-CoV Rp3. The samples tested negative.

To uncover a possible cause of the infection, different animals (including bats, rats, and musk shrews) were also sampled in and around the mining cave. Between 2012 and 2015, Shi Zhengli and her group isolated 293 different coronaviruses (284 alpha- and 9 beta-coronaviruses) from bat feces samples in the cave. One of the samples collected in 2013 from Rhinolophus affinis (the intermediate horseshoe bat) contained a novel sequence of ribonucleic acids later identified as "RaTG13".

In 2020, Shi and her group retested the serum samples from the miners for SARS-CoV-2. The samples tested negative.

In 2020, the strain identified in the sample was renamed from the original Ra4991 (4991st sample collected from Rhinolophus affinis) to "RaTG13", to reflect the originating bat species (Ra from Rhinolophus affinis), geographic location (TG from Tongguan), and year collected (13 from 2013). The name change has been highlighted by advocates of the lab leak theory for the COVID-19 pandemic, an argument that Snopes dismissed as "innuendo".

== Virology ==
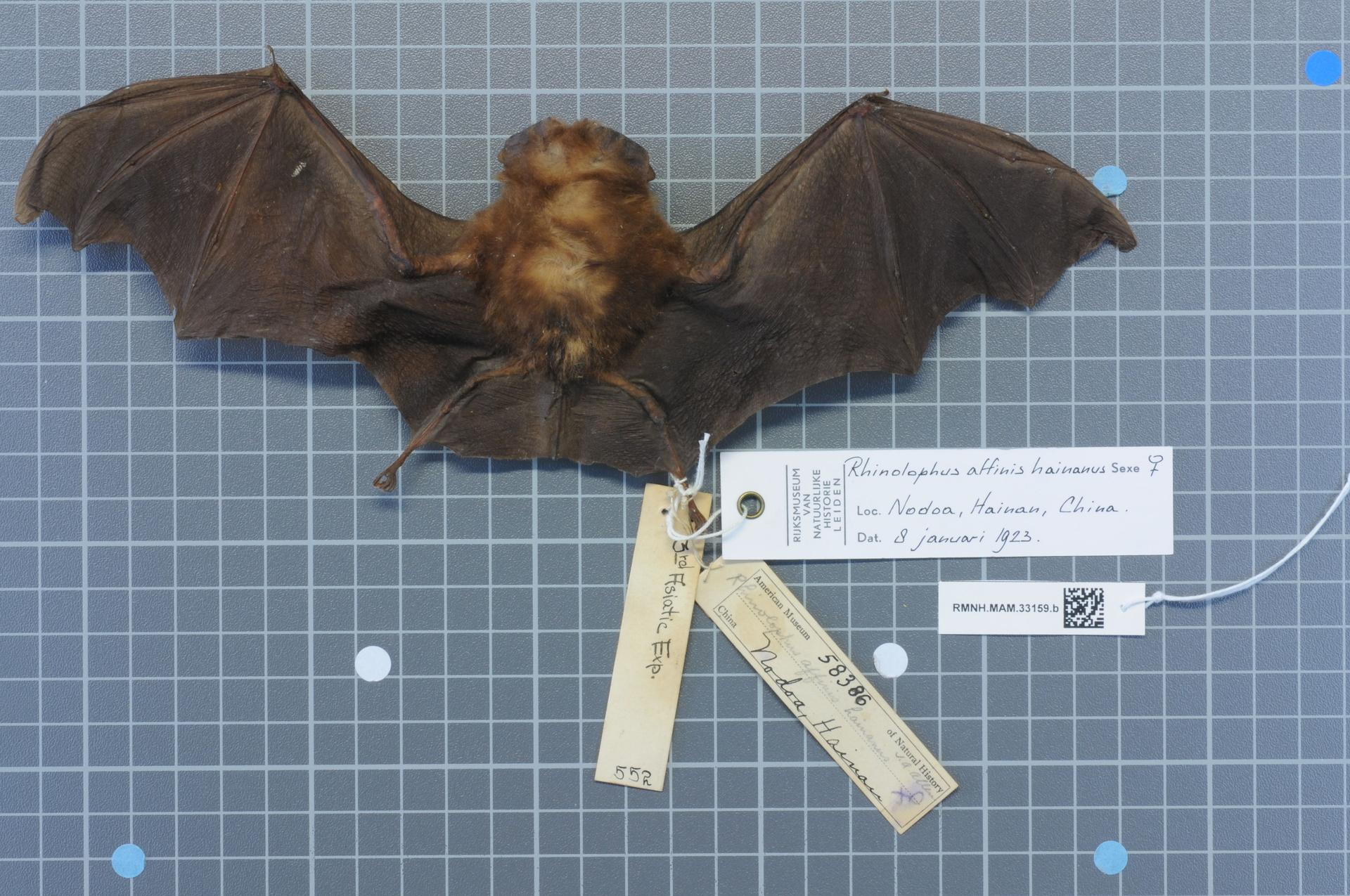
A specimen of Rhinolophus affinis

The sequence of RaTG13 was reconstructed from metagenomic sampling (a common practice in environmental virology), and as such, could potentially be an in-silico chimera. RaTG13 has not been confirmed to exist in nature, to have been cultured or isolated in any laboratory, or to be a viable human pathogen. A live virus "RaTG13" has never been detected in any laboratory sample from the WIV or elsewhere.

Based on its sequence, RaTG13 is a positive-strand RNA virus with an outer membrane. Its genome is approximately 29,800 nucleotides. The genome encodes a replicase (ORF1a/1b) and four structural proteins; including a spike protein (S), membrane protein (M), envelope protein (E) and nucleocapsid protein (N); and five viral accessory proteins, including ORF3a (NS3), ORF6 (NS6), ORF7a (NS7a), ORF7b (NS7b) and ORF8 (NS8).

RaTG13 bears strong resemblance to the SARS-CoV-2 genome (it shares 96.1% nucleotide similarity), and its identification in animal droppings is a supporting piece of evidence for SARS-CoV-2's natural origin. The main area of divergence between RaTG13 and SARS-CoV-2 is in the receptor-binding domain (RBD) of the spike protein (S), which is the portion that binds to the receptor protein on the surface of the host cell and causes infection. The divergence in this domain indicates that, unlike SARS-CoV-2, the RaTG13 virus might not use angiotensin-converting enzyme 2 (ACE2) as its entry site into the cell. Further, the S protein of RaTG13 virus lacks the furin cleavage motif RRAR↓S.

The binding affinity between RATG13 and hACE2 is lower than that between SARS-CoV-2 RBD and hACE2.

== Phylogenetics ==
=== Phylogenetic tree ===
A phylogenetic tree based on whole-genome sequences of SARS-CoV-2 and related coronaviruses is:

- SARS‑CoV‑2 related coronavirus
  - (Bat) Rc-o319, 81% to SARS-CoV-2, Rhinolophus cornutus, Iwate, Japan
  - - - Bat SL-ZXC21, 88% to SARS-CoV-2, Rhinolophus pusillus, Zhoushan, Zhejiang
      - Bat SL-ZC45, 88% to SARS-CoV-2, Rhinolophus pusillus, Zhoushan, Zhejiang
    - - Pangolin SARSr-CoV-GX, 85.3% to SARS-CoV-2, Manis javanica, smuggled from Southeast Asia
      - - Pangolin SARSr-CoV-GD, 90.1% to SARS-CoV-2, Manis javanica, smuggled from Southeast Asia
        - - - Bat RshSTT182, 92.6% to SARS-CoV-2, Rhinolophus shameli, Steung Treng, Cambodia
            - Bat RshSTT200, 92.6% to SARS-CoV-2, Rhinolophus shameli, Steung Treng, Cambodia
          - - (Bat) RacCS203, 91.5% to SARS-CoV-2, Rhinolophus acuminatus, Chachoengsao, Thailand
            - (Bat) RmYN02, 93.3% to SARS-CoV-2, Rhinolophus malayanus, Mengla, Yunnan
          - (Bat) RpYN06, 94.4% to SARS-CoV-2, Rhinolophus pusillus, Xishuangbanna, Yunnan
          - - (Bat) RaTG13, 96.1% to SARS-CoV-2, Rhinolophus affinis, Mojiang, Yunnan
            - (Bat) BANAL-52, 96.8% to SARS-CoV-2, Rhinolophus malayanus, Vientiane, Laos
            - SARS-CoV-2
- SARS-CoV-1, 79% to SARS-CoV-2

== See also ==
- Bat SARS-like coronavirus RsSHC014
- Bat SARS-like coronavirus WIV1
- Mòjiāng virus
