= RpYN06 =

BatCoV RpYN06

Virus classification
- (unranked): Virus
- Realm: Riboviria
- Kingdom: Orthornavirae
- Phylum: Pisuviricota
- Class: Pisoniviricetes
- Order: Nidovirales
- Family: Coronaviridae
- Genus: Betacoronavirus
- Subgenus: Sarbecovirus
- Species: Betacoronavirus pandemicum
- Strain: BatCoV RpYN06

SARS-like betacoronavirus

Bat coronavirus RpYN06 is a SARS-like betacoronavirus that infects the horseshoe bat Rhinolophus pusillus. It is a close relative of SARS-CoV-2 with a 94.48% sequence identity.

== Phylogenetics ==
A phylogenetic tree based on whole-genome sequences of SARS-CoV-2 and related coronaviruses is:

- SARS‑CoV‑2 related coronavirus
  - (Bat) Rc-o319, 81% to SARS-CoV-2, Rhinolophus cornutus, Iwate, Japan
  - - - Bat SL-ZXC21, 88% to SARS-CoV-2, Rhinolophus pusillus, Zhoushan, Zhejiang
      - Bat SL-ZC45, 88% to SARS-CoV-2, Rhinolophus pusillus, Zhoushan, Zhejiang
    - - Pangolin SARSr-CoV-GX, 85.3% to SARS-CoV-2, Manis javanica, smuggled from Southeast Asia
      - - Pangolin SARSr-CoV-GD, 90.1% to SARS-CoV-2, Manis javanica, smuggled from Southeast Asia
        - - - Bat RshSTT182, 92.6% to SARS-CoV-2, Rhinolophus shameli, Steung Treng, Cambodia
            - Bat RshSTT200, 92.6% to SARS-CoV-2, Rhinolophus shameli, Steung Treng, Cambodia
          - - (Bat) RacCS203, 91.5% to SARS-CoV-2, Rhinolophus acuminatus, Chachoengsao, Thailand
            - (Bat) RmYN02, 93.3% to SARS-CoV-2, Rhinolophus malayanus, Mengla, Yunnan
          - (Bat) RpYN06, 94.4% to SARS-CoV-2, Rhinolophus pusillus, Xishuangbanna, Yunnan
          - - (Bat) RaTG13, 96.1% to SARS-CoV-2, Rhinolophus affinis, Mojiang, Yunnan
            - (Bat) BANAL-52, 96.8% to SARS-CoV-2, Rhinolophus malayanus, Vientiane, Laos
            - SARS-CoV-2
- SARS-CoV-1, 79% to SARS-CoV-2
