= RmYN02 =

Virus classification
- (unranked): Virus
- Realm: Riboviria
- Kingdom: Orthornavirae
- Phylum: Pisuviricota
- Class: Pisoniviricetes
- Order: Nidovirales
- Family: Coronaviridae
- Genus: Betacoronavirus
- Subgenus: Sarbecovirus
- Species: Betacoronavirus pandemicum
- Strain: RmYN02

Strain of SARS-related coronavirus

RmYN02 is a bat-derived strain of severe acute respiratory syndrome–related coronavirus. It was discovered in bat droppings collected between May and October 2019 from sites in Mengla County, Yunnan Province, China. It is the second-closest known relative of SARS-CoV-2, the virus strain that causes COVID-19, sharing 93.3% nucleotide identity at the scale of the complete virus genome. RmYN02 contains an insertion at the S1/S2 cleavage site in the spike protein, similar to SARS-CoV-2, suggesting that such insertion events can occur naturally. Other researchers have questioned the validity of this as an authentic furin cleavage site insertion, noting that it appears more likely to be a deletion of two amino acids at that locus.

== Genetics ==
It shares 93.3% genome with SARS-CoV-2. RmYN02 was 97.2% identical to SARS-CoV-2 in the 1ab. RmYN02 was 71.8% identical in nucleotide and 97.4% in amino acid to SARS-CoV-2 in the S gene, compared to 97.4% amino acid identity between RaTG13 and SARS-CoV-2. All genetic data were found by Weifeng Shi and his team.

== Discovery ==
RmYN02 was collected between May and July, 2019, in Yunnan by Professor Alice C. Hughes from Xishuangbanna Tropical Botanical Garden, and sequenced by Weifeng Shi from Shandong Medical University, based on an analysis of 302 feces samples collected from 227 bats that were collected from Mengla County, Yunnan Province, China, within a short distance from the Xishuangbanna Tropical Botanical Garden. The genome itself was assembled from a pool of 11 samples.

A phylogenetic tree based on whole-genome sequences of SARS-CoV-2 and related coronaviruses is:

- SARS‑CoV‑2 related coronavirus
  - (Bat) Rc-o319, 81% to SARS-CoV-2, Rhinolophus cornutus, Iwate, Japan
  - - - Bat SL-ZXC21, 88% to SARS-CoV-2, Rhinolophus pusillus, Zhoushan, Zhejiang
      - Bat SL-ZC45, 88% to SARS-CoV-2, Rhinolophus pusillus, Zhoushan, Zhejiang
    - - Pangolin SARSr-CoV-GX, 85.3% to SARS-CoV-2, Manis javanica, smuggled from Southeast Asia
      - - Pangolin SARSr-CoV-GD, 90.1% to SARS-CoV-2, Manis javanica, smuggled from Southeast Asia
        - - - Bat RshSTT182, 92.6% to SARS-CoV-2, Rhinolophus shameli, Steung Treng, Cambodia
            - Bat RshSTT200, 92.6% to SARS-CoV-2, Rhinolophus shameli, Steung Treng, Cambodia
          - - (Bat) RacCS203, 91.5% to SARS-CoV-2, Rhinolophus acuminatus, Chachoengsao, Thailand
            - (Bat) RmYN02, 93.3% to SARS-CoV-2, Rhinolophus malayanus, Mengla, Yunnan
          - (Bat) RpYN06, 94.4% to SARS-CoV-2, Rhinolophus pusillus, Xishuangbanna, Yunnan
          - - (Bat) RaTG13, 96.1% to SARS-CoV-2, Rhinolophus affinis, Mojiang, Yunnan
            - (Bat) BANAL-52, 96.8% to SARS-CoV-2, Rhinolophus malayanus, Vientiane, Laos
            - SARS-CoV-2
- SARS-CoV-1, 79% to SARS-CoV-2

== See also ==
- Bat SARS-like coronavirus RsSHC014
- Bat SARS-like coronavirus WIV1
