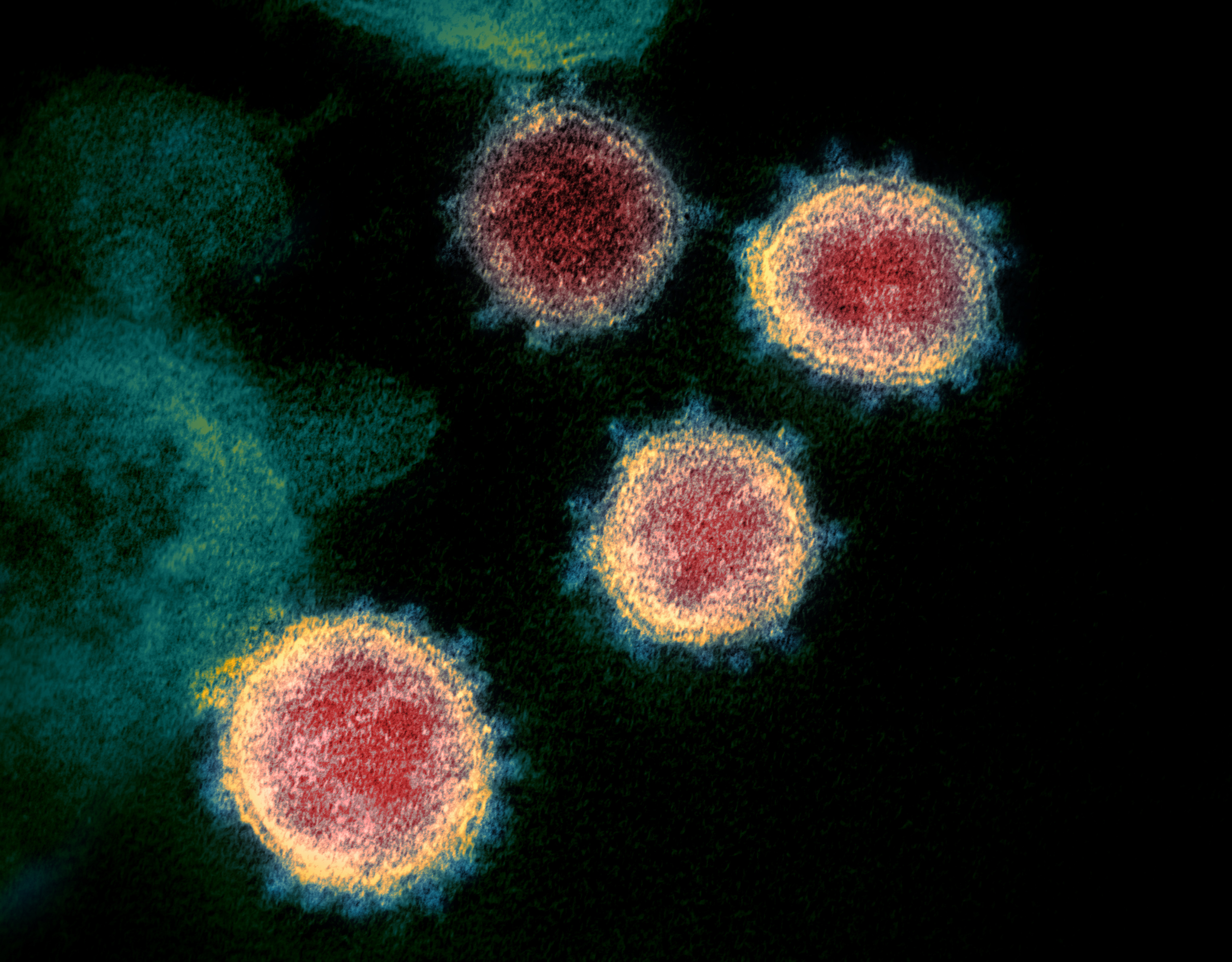
- Colourised transmission electron micrograph of SARS-CoV-2 virions with visible coronae
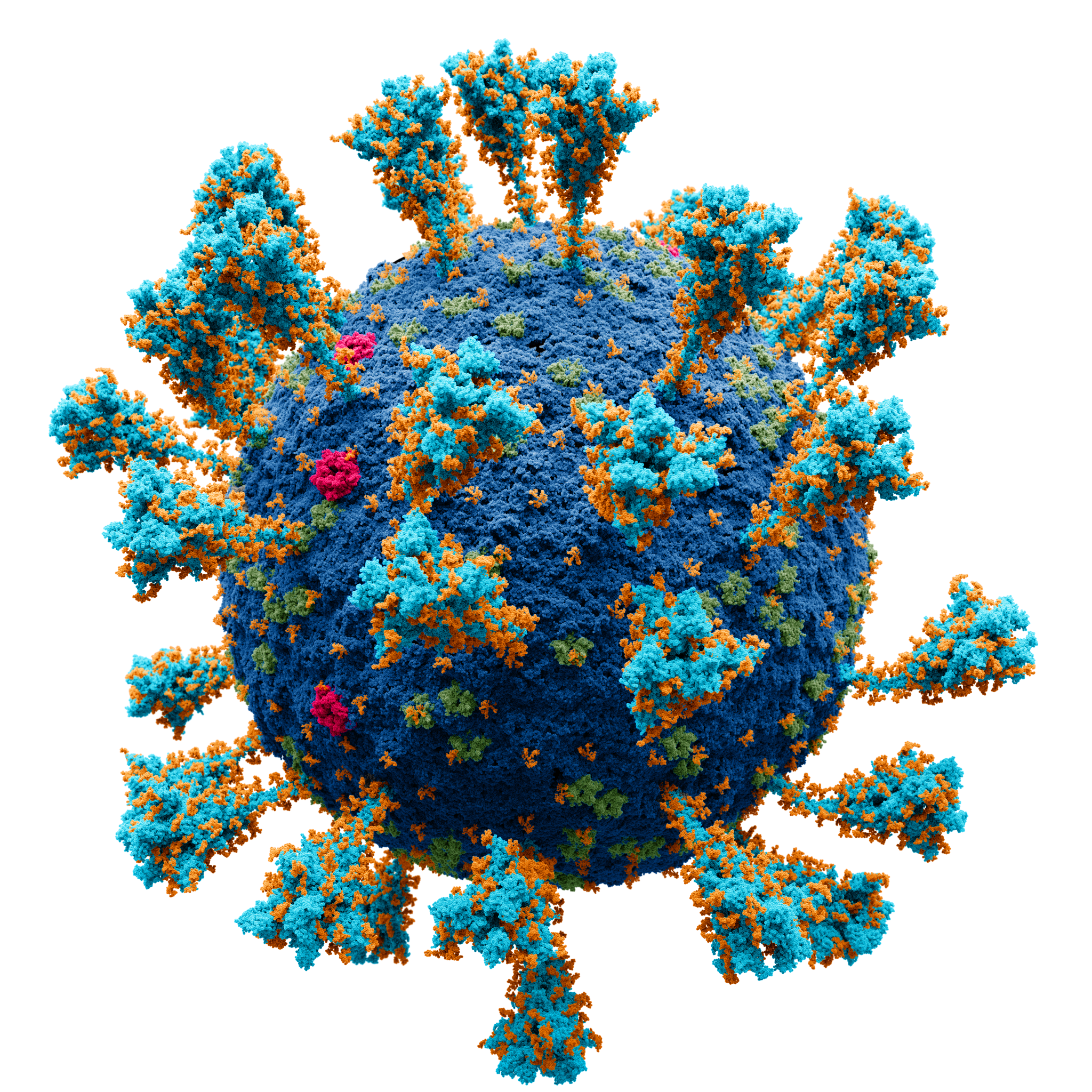
Model of the external structure of the SARS-CoV-2 virion
● Blue:	envelope
● Turquoise:	spike glycoprotein (S)
● Pink:	envelope proteins (E)
● Green:	membrane proteins (M)
● Orange:	glycan

Virus classification
- (unranked): Virus
- Realm: Riboviria
- Kingdom: Orthornavirae
- Phylum: Pisuviricota
- Class: Pisoniviricetes
- Order: Nidovirales
- Family: Coronaviridae
- Genus: Betacoronavirus
- Subgenus: Sarbecovirus
- Species: Betacoronavirus pandemicum
- Virus: Severe acute respiratory syndrome coronavirus 2

Notable variants
- Alpha (B.1.1.7); Beta (B.1.351); Gamma (P.1); Delta (B.1.617.2); Omicron (B.1.1.529); Full list

Synonyms
- 2019-nCoV; COVID-19 virus; Human coronavirus 2019; HCoV-19; SARS-2

= SARS-CoV-2 =

Severe acute respiratory syndrome coronavirus 2

Virus that causes COVID-19

Severe acute respiratory syndrome coronavirus 2 (SARS‑CoV‑2) (Note: The virus previously had the provisional name 2019 novel coronavirus (2019-nCoV), and has also been called human coronavirus 2019 (HCoV-19 or hCoV-19).) is a coronavirus that causes COVID-19, the respiratory illness responsible for the COVID-19 pandemic that began in late 2019. SARS‑CoV‑2 is a positive-sense single-stranded RNA virus that is contagious in humans. First identified in the city of Wuhan, Hubei, China, the World Health Organization designated the outbreak a public health emergency of international concern from January 30, 2020, to May 5, 2023.

SARS‑CoV‑2 is a virus of the species Betacoronavirus pandemicum (SARSr-CoV), as is SARS-CoV-1, the virus that caused the 2002–2004 SARS outbreak. Some animal-borne coronaviruses are more closely related to SARS-CoV-2 than SARS-CoV-1 is. The closest known relative is the BANAL-52 bat coronavirus. SARS-CoV-2 is of zoonotic origin; its close genetic similarity to bat coronaviruses suggests it emerged from such a bat-borne virus. Research is ongoing as to whether SARS‑CoV‑2 came directly from bats or indirectly through any intermediate hosts. The virus shows little genetic diversity, indicating that the spillover event introducing SARS‑CoV‑2 to humans is likely to have occurred in late 2019.

Epidemiological studies estimate that in the period between December 2019 and September 2020 each infection resulted in an average of 2.4–3.4 new infections when no members of the community were immune and no preventive measures were taken. Some later variants were more infectious. The virus is airborne and primarily spreads between people through close contact and via aerosols and respiratory droplets that are exhaled when talking, breathing, or otherwise exhaling, as well as those produced from coughs and sneezes. It enters human cells by binding to angiotensin-converting enzyme 2 (ACE2), a membrane protein that regulates the renin–angiotensin system.

== Terminology ==
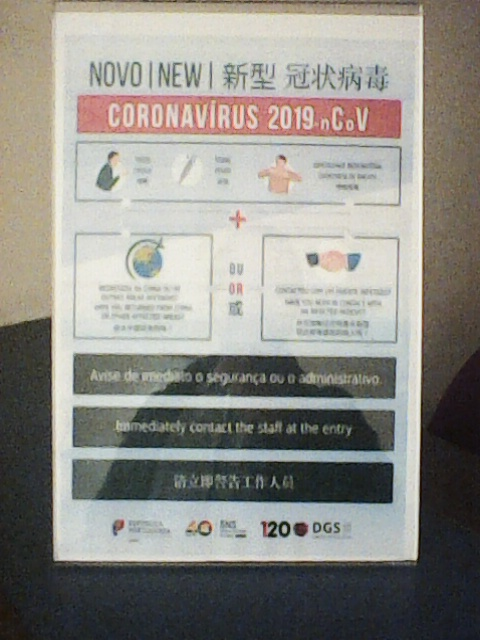
Sign with provisional name "2019-nCoV"

During the initial outbreak in Wuhan, China, various names were used for the virus; some names used by different sources included "the coronavirus" or "Wuhan coronavirus". In January 2020, the World Health Organization (WHO) recommended "2019 novel coronavirus" (2019-nCoV) as the provisional name for the virus. This was in accordance with WHO's 2015 guidance against using geographical locations, animal species, or groups of people in disease and virus names.

On 11 February 2020, the International Committee on Taxonomy of Viruses adopted the official name "severe acute respiratory syndrome coronavirus 2" (SARS‑CoV‑2). To avoid confusion with the disease SARS, the WHO sometimes refers to SARS‑CoV‑2 as "the COVID-19 virus" in public health communications and the name HCoV-19 was included in some research articles. Referring to COVID-19 as the "Wuhan virus" has been described as dangerous by WHO officials, and as xenophobic by many journalists and academics.

== Infection and transmission ==
Human-to-human transmission of SARS‑CoV‑2 was confirmed on 20 January 2020 during the COVID-19 pandemic. Transmission was initially assumed to occur primarily via respiratory droplets from coughs and sneezes within a range of about 1.8 metres (6 ft). Laser light scattering experiments suggest that speaking is an additional mode of transmission and a far-reaching one, indoors, with little air flow. Other studies have suggested that the virus may be airborne as well, with aerosols potentially being able to transmit the virus. During human-to-human transmission, between 200 and 800 infectious SARS‑CoV‑2 virions are thought to initiate a new infection. If confirmed, aerosol transmission has biosafety implications because a major concern associated with the risk of working with emerging viruses in the laboratory is the generation of aerosols from various laboratory activities which are not immediately recognisable and may affect other scientific personnel. Indirect contact via contaminated surfaces is another possible cause of infection. Preliminary research indicates that the virus may remain viable on plastic (polypropylene) and stainless steel (AISI 304) for up to three days, but it does not survive on cardboard for more than one day or on copper for more than four hours. The virus is inactivated by soap, which destabilises its lipid bilayer. Viral RNA has also been found in stool samples and semen from infected individuals.

The degree to which the virus is infectious during the incubation period is uncertain, but research has indicated that the pharynx reaches peak viral load approximately four days after infection or in the first week of symptoms and declines thereafter. The duration of SARS-CoV-2 RNA shedding is generally between 3 and 46 days after symptom onset.

A study by a team of researchers from the University of North Carolina found that the nasal cavity is seemingly the dominant initial site of infection, with subsequent aspiration-mediated virus-seeding into the lungs in SARS‑CoV‑2 pathogenesis. They found that there was an infection gradient from high in proximal towards low in distal pulmonary epithelial cultures, with a focal infection in ciliated cells and type 2 pneumocytes in the airway and alveolar regions respectively.

Studies have identified a range of animals—such as cats, ferrets, hamsters, non-human primates, minks, tree shrews, raccoon dogs, fruit bats, and rabbits—that are susceptible and permissive to SARS-CoV-2 infection. Some institutions have advised that those infected with SARS‑CoV‑2 restrict their contact with animals.

=== Asymptomatic and presymptomatic transmission ===
On 1 February 2020, the World Health Organization (WHO) indicated that "transmission from asymptomatic cases is likely not a major driver of transmission". One meta-analysis found that 17% of infections are asymptomatic, and asymptomatic individuals were 42% less likely to transmit the virus.

However, an epidemiological model of the beginning of the outbreak in China suggested that "pre-symptomatic shedding may be typical among documented infections" and that subclinical infections may have been the source of a majority of infections. That may explain how out of 217 on board a cruise liner that docked at Montevideo, only 24 of 128 who tested positive for viral RNA showed symptoms. Similarly, a study of ninety-four patients hospitalised in January and February 2020 estimated patients began shedding virus two to three days before symptoms appear and that "a substantial proportion of transmission probably occurred before first symptoms in the index case". The authors later published a correction that showed that shedding began earlier than first estimated, four to five days before symptoms appear.

=== Reinfection ===
There is uncertainty about reinfection and long-term immunity. It is not known how common reinfection is, but reports have indicated that it is occurring with variable severity.

The first reported case of reinfection was a 33-year-old man from Hong Kong who first tested positive on 26 March 2020, was discharged on 15 April 2020 after two negative tests, and tested positive again on 15 August 2020 (142 days later), which was confirmed by whole-genome sequencing showing that the viral genomes between the episodes belong to different clades. The findings had the implications that herd immunity may not eliminate the virus if reinfection is not an uncommon occurrence and that vaccines may not be able to provide lifelong protection against the virus.

Another case study described a 25-year-old man from Nevada who tested positive for SARS‑CoV‑2 on 18 April 2020 and on 5 June 2020 (separated by two negative tests). Since genomic analyses showed significant genetic differences between the SARS‑CoV‑2 variant sampled on those two dates, the case study authors determined this was a reinfection. The man's second infection was symptomatically more severe than the first infection, but the mechanisms that could account for this are not known.

== Reservoir and origin ==
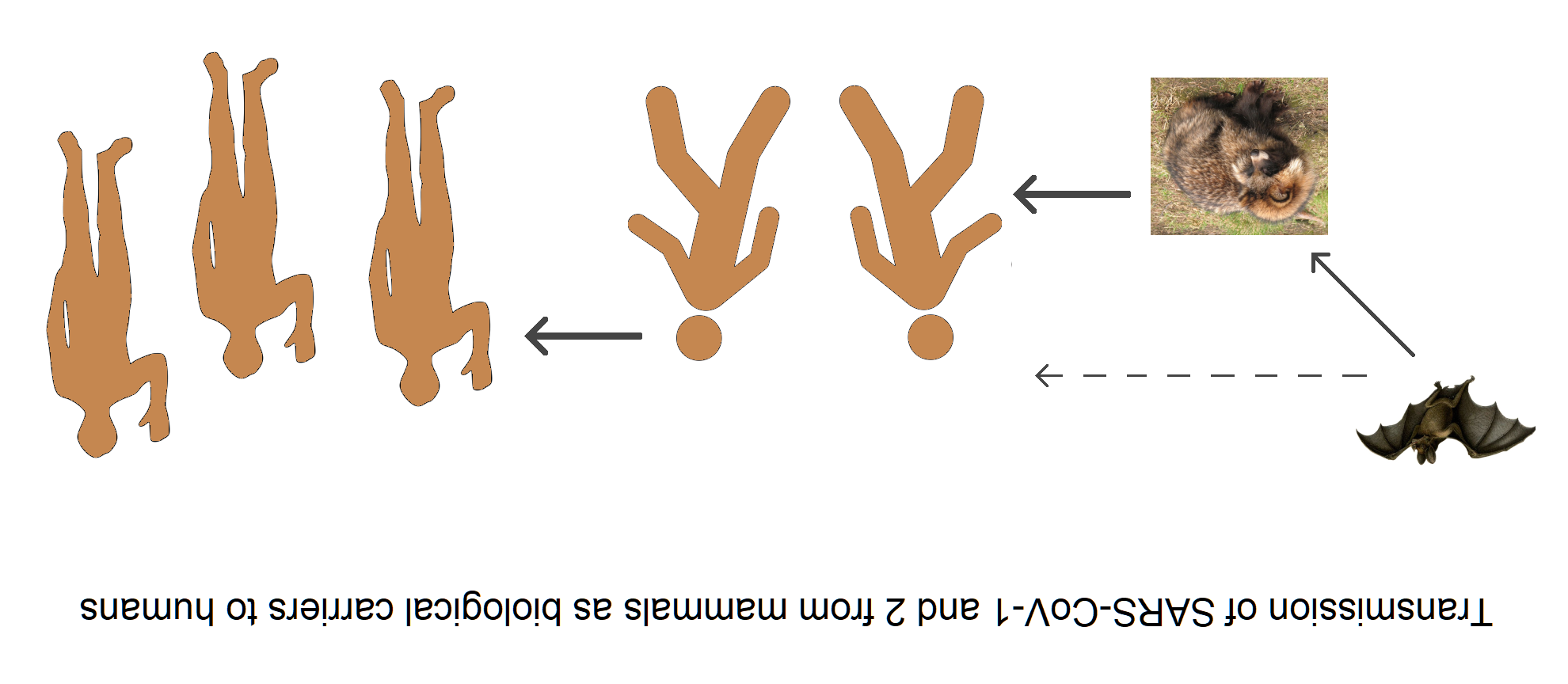
Transmission of SARS-CoV-1 and SARS‑CoV‑2 from mammals as biological carriers to humans

No natural reservoir for SARS-CoV-2 has been identified. Prior to the emergence of SARS-CoV-2 as a pathogen infecting humans, there had been two previous zoonosis-based coronavirus epidemics, those caused by SARS-CoV-1 and MERS-CoV.

The first known infections from SARS‑CoV‑2 were discovered in Wuhan, China. The nature of the virus's origins remain unclear and disputed. The original source of viral transmission to humans remains unclear, as does whether the virus became pathogenic before or after the spillover event. Because many of the early infectees were workers at the Huanan Seafood Market, it has been suggested that the virus might have originated from the market. Other research indicates that visitors may have introduced the virus to the market, which then facilitated rapid expansion of the infections. A March 2021 WHO-convened report stated that human spillover via an intermediate animal host was the most likely explanation, with direct spillover from bats next most likely. Introduction through the food supply chain and the Huanan Seafood Market was considered another possible, but less likely, explanation. Later analysis in November 2021 said that the earliest-known case had been misidentified and that the preponderance of early cases linked to the Huanan Market argued for it being the source.

For a virus recently acquired through a cross-species transmission, rapid evolution is expected. The mutation rate estimated from early cases of SARS-CoV-2 was of 6.54×10^{−4} per site per year. Coronaviruses in general have high genetic plasticity, but SARS-CoV-2's viral evolution is slowed by the RNA proofreading capability of its replication machinery. For comparison, the viral mutation rate in vivo of SARS-CoV-2 has been found to be lower than that of influenza.

Research into the natural reservoir of the virus that caused the 2002–2004 SARS outbreak has resulted in the discovery of many SARS-like bat coronaviruses, most originating in horseshoe bats. The closest match, at the time of publication in Nature (journal) in February 2022, were viruses BANAL-52 (96.8% resemblance to SARS‑CoV‑2), BANAL-103 and BANAL-236, collected in three different species of bats in Feuang, Laos. An earlier source published in February 2020 identified the virus RaTG13, collected in bats in Mojiang, Yunnan, China to be the closest to SARS‑CoV‑2, with 96.1% resemblance. None of the above are its direct ancestor.

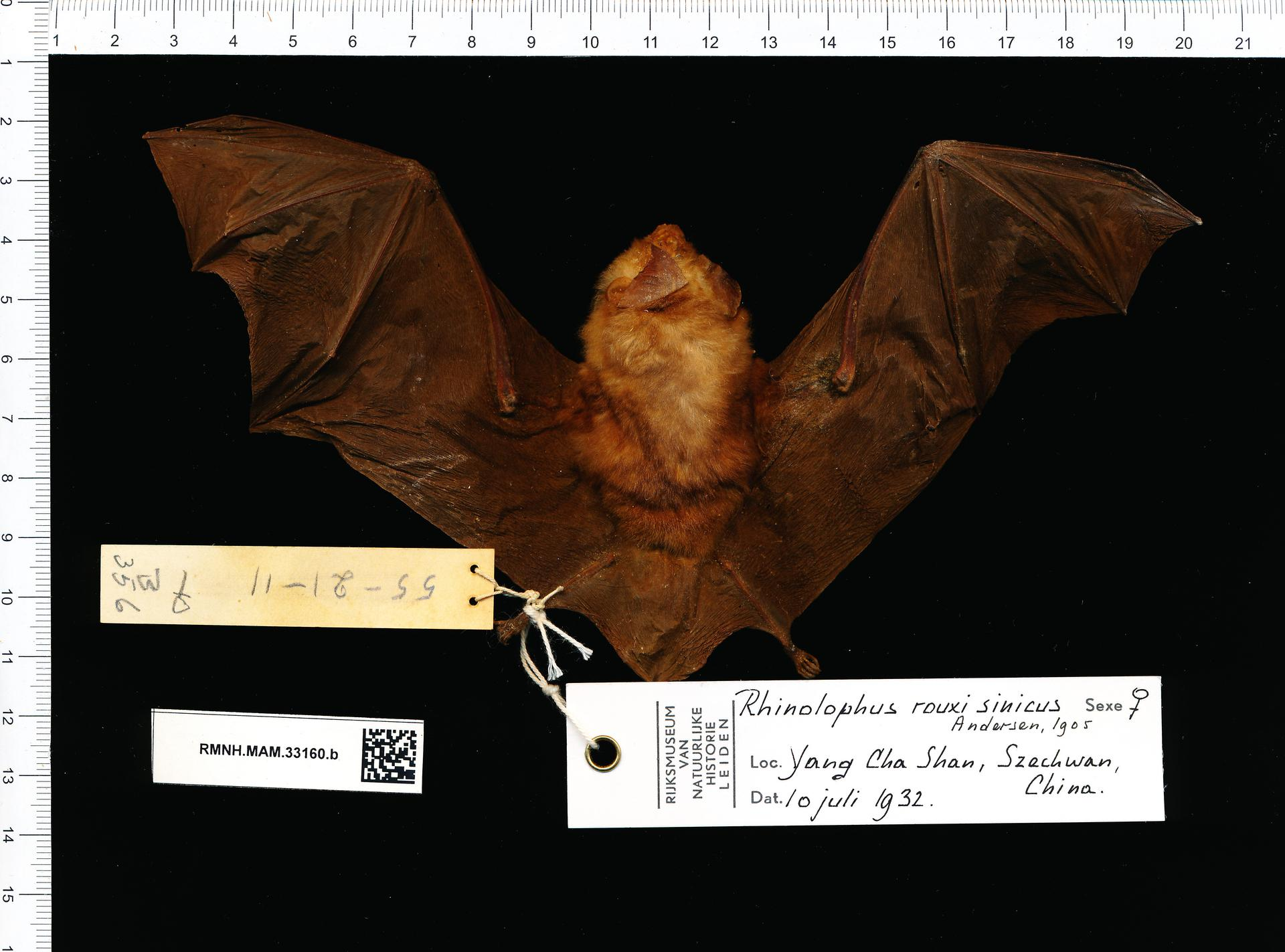
Samples taken from Rhinolophus sinicus, a species of horseshoe bats, show an 80% resemblance to SARS‑CoV‑2.

Bats are considered the most likely natural reservoir of SARS‑CoV‑2. Differences between the bat coronavirus and SARS‑CoV‑2 suggest that humans may have been infected via an intermediate host; the source of introduction into humans remains unknown.

After a July 2020 study initially suggested pangolins as an intermediate host of SARS‑CoV‑2-like coronaviruses, subsequent studies have not substantiated their contribution to the spillover. Evidence against this hypothesis includes the fact that pangolin virus samples are too distant to SARS-CoV-2: isolates obtained from pangolins seized in Guangdong were only 92% identical in sequence to the SARS‑CoV‑2 genome (a wide evolutionary gap in genomic terms). Furthermore, despite similarities in a few critical amino acids, pangolin virus samples exhibit poor binding to the human ACE2 receptor.

== Phylogenetics and taxonomy ==
Genomic information
- Genomic organisation of isolate Wuhan-Hu-1, the earliest sequenced sample of SARS-CoV-2
- NCBI ID: GCF_009858895.2
- Genome size: 29,903 bases
- Year of completion: 2020
- UCSC Genome Browser assembly ID: wuhCor1

SARS‑CoV‑2 belongs to the broad family of viruses known as coronaviruses. It is a positive-sense single-stranded RNA (+ssRNA) virus, with a single linear RNA segment. Coronaviruses infect humans, other mammals, including livestock and companion animals, and avian species. Human coronaviruses can cause illnesses ranging from the common cold to more severe diseases such as Middle East respiratory syndrome (MERS, fatality rate ~34%). SARS-CoV-2 is the seventh known coronavirus to infect people, after 229E, NL63, OC43, HKU1, MERS-CoV, and the original SARS-CoV-1.

Like the SARS-related coronavirus implicated in the 2003 SARS outbreak, SARS‑CoV‑2 is a member of the subgenus Sarbecovirus (beta-CoV lineage B). Coronaviruses undergo frequent recombination. The mechanism of recombination in unsegmented RNA viruses such as SARS-CoV-2 is generally by copy-choice replication, in which gene material switches from one RNA template molecule to another during replication. The SARS-CoV-2 RNA sequence is approximately 30,000 bases in length, relatively long for a coronavirus—which in turn carry the largest genomes among all RNA families. Its genome consists nearly entirely of protein-coding sequences, a trait shared with other coronaviruses.

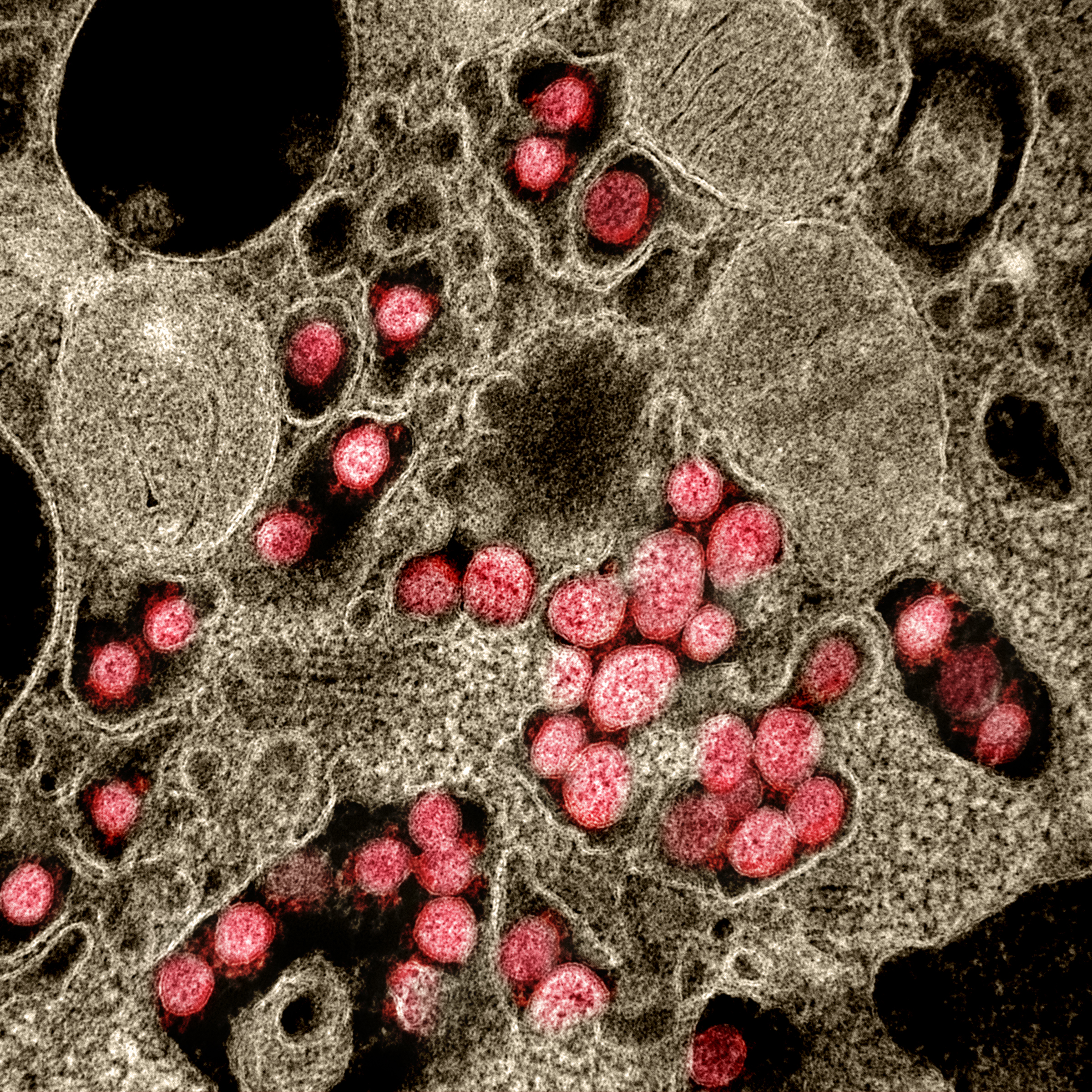
Transmission electron micrograph of SARS‑CoV‑2 virions (red) isolated from a patient during the COVID-19 pandemic

A distinguishing feature of SARS‑CoV‑2 is its incorporation of a polybasic site cleaved by furin, which appears to be an important element enhancing its virulence. It was suggested that the acquisition of the furin-cleavage site in the SARS-CoV-2 S protein was essential for zoonotic transfer to humans. The furin protease recognises the canonical peptide sequence RX[R/K] R↓X where the cleavage site is indicated by a down arrow and X is any amino acid. In SARS-CoV-2 the recognition site is formed by the incorporated 12 codon nucleotide sequence CCT CGG CGG GCA which corresponds to the amino acid sequence P RR A. This sequence is upstream of an arginine and serine which forms the S1/S2 cleavage site (P RR A R↓S) of the spike protein. Although such sites are a common naturally-occurring feature of other viruses within the Subfamily Orthocoronavirinae, it appears in few other viruses from the Beta-CoV genus, and it is unique among members of its subgenus for such a site. The closest relatives to SARS-CoV-2, including BANAL-20-52, RaTG13, Pangolin P4L, and SARS-CoV-1, lack the RRAR insertion. The furin cleavage site PRRAR↓ is highly similar to that of the feline coronavirus, an alphacoronavirus 1 virus.

Viral genetic sequence data can provide critical information about whether viruses separated by time and space are likely to be epidemiologically linked. With a sufficient number of sequenced genomes, it is possible to reconstruct a phylogenetic tree of the mutation history of a family of viruses. By 12 January 2020, five genomes of SARS‑CoV‑2 had been isolated from Wuhan and reported by the Chinese Center for Disease Control and Prevention (CCDC) and other institutions; the number of genomes increased to 42 by 30 January 2020. A phylogenetic analysis of those samples showed they were "highly related with at most seven mutations relative to a common ancestor", implying that the first human infection occurred in November or December 2019. Examination of the topology of the phylogenetic tree at the start of the pandemic also found high similarities between human isolates. As of 21 August 2021, 3,422 SARS‑CoV‑2 genomes, belonging to 19 strains, sampled on all continents except Antarctica were publicly available.

On 11 February 2020, the International Committee on Taxonomy of Viruses announced that according to existing rules that compute hierarchical relationships among coronaviruses based on five conserved sequences of nucleic acids, the differences between what was then called 2019-nCoV and the virus from the 2003 SARS outbreak were insufficient to make them separate viral species. Therefore, they identified 2019-nCoV as a virus of severe acute respiratory syndrome–related coronavirus.

In July 2020, scientists reported that a more infectious SARS‑CoV‑2 variant with spike protein variant G614 has replaced D614 as the dominant form in the pandemic.

Coronavirus genomes and subgenomes encode six open reading frames (ORFs). In October 2020, researchers discovered a possible overlapping gene named ORF3d, in the SARS‑CoV‑2 genome. It is unknown if the protein produced by ORF3d has any function, but it provokes a strong immune response. ORF3d has been identified before, in a variant of coronavirus that infects pangolins.

=== Phylogenetic tree ===
A phylogenetic tree based on whole-genome sequences of SARS-CoV-2 and related coronaviruses is:

- SARS‑CoV‑2 related coronavirus
  - (Bat) Rc-o319, 81% to SARS-CoV-2, Rhinolophus cornutus, Iwate, Japan
  - - - Bat SL-ZXC21, 88% to SARS-CoV-2, Rhinolophus pusillus, Zhoushan, Zhejiang
      - Bat SL-ZC45, 88% to SARS-CoV-2, Rhinolophus pusillus, Zhoushan, Zhejiang
    - - Pangolin SARSr-CoV-GX, 85.3% to SARS-CoV-2, Manis javanica, smuggled from Southeast Asia
      - - Pangolin SARSr-CoV-GD, 90.1% to SARS-CoV-2, Manis javanica, smuggled from Southeast Asia
        - - - Bat RshSTT182, 92.6% to SARS-CoV-2, Rhinolophus shameli, Steung Treng, Cambodia
            - Bat RshSTT200, 92.6% to SARS-CoV-2, Rhinolophus shameli, Steung Treng, Cambodia
          - - (Bat) RacCS203, 91.5% to SARS-CoV-2, Rhinolophus acuminatus, Chachoengsao, Thailand
            - (Bat) RmYN02, 93.3% to SARS-CoV-2, Rhinolophus malayanus, Mengla, Yunnan
          - (Bat) RpYN06, 94.4% to SARS-CoV-2, Rhinolophus pusillus, Xishuangbanna, Yunnan
          - - (Bat) RaTG13, 96.1% to SARS-CoV-2, Rhinolophus affinis, Mojiang, Yunnan
            - (Bat) BANAL-52, 96.8% to SARS-CoV-2, Rhinolophus malayanus, Vientiane, Laos
            - SARS-CoV-2
- SARS-CoV-1, 79% to SARS-CoV-2

==== Variants ====
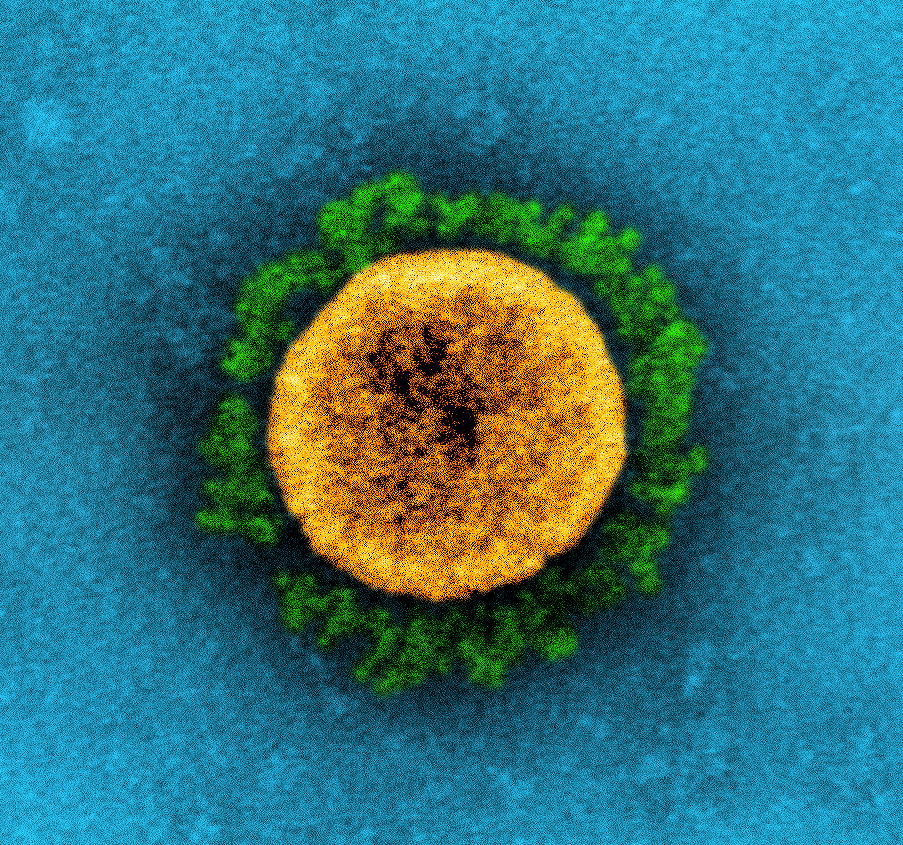
False-colour transmission electron micrograph of a B.1.1.7 variant coronavirus. The variant's increased transmissibility is believed to be due to changes in the structure of the spike proteins, shown here in green.

There are many thousands of variants of SARS-CoV-2, which can be grouped into the much larger clades. Several different clade nomenclatures have been proposed. Nextstrain divides the variants into five clades (19A, 19B, 20A, 20B, and 20C), while GISAID divides them into seven (L, O, V, S, G, GH, and GR).

Several notable variants of SARS-CoV-2 emerged in late 2020. The World Health Organization has currently declared five variants of concern, which are as follows:

- Alpha: Lineage B.1.1.7 emerged in the United Kingdom in September 2020, with evidence of increased transmissibility and virulence. Notable mutations include N501Y and P681H.
  - An E484K mutation in some lineage B.1.1.7 virions has been noted and is also tracked by various public health agencies.
- Beta: Lineage B.1.351 emerged in South Africa in May 2020, with evidence of increased transmissibility and changes to antigenicity, with some public health officials raising alarms about its impact on the efficacy of some vaccines. Notable mutations include K417N, E484K and N501Y.
- Gamma: Lineage P.1 emerged in Brazil in November 2020, also with evidence of increased transmissibility and virulence, alongside changes to antigenicity. Similar concerns about vaccine efficacy have been raised. Notable mutations also include K417N, E484K and N501Y.
- Delta: Lineage B.1.617.2 emerged in India in October 2020. There is also evidence of increased transmissibility and virulence, and changes to antigenicity.
- Omicron: Lineage B.1.1.529 emerged around Botswana in November 2021. This lineage demonstrated significantly increased transmissibility and changes to antigenicity, and it subsequently dominated all circulating versions of the virus ever since its emergence.
  - Omicron variant BA.3.2 was reported to be widespread across Europe and the US in April 2026. The variant has many changes to the spike protein, but had not been found to be more virulent than other Omicron variants, and existing vaccines protected against it.

Other notable variants include 6 other WHO-designated variants under investigation and Cluster 5, which emerged among mink in Denmark and resulted in a mink euthanasia campaign rendering it virtually extinct.

== Virology ==
=== Virus structure ===
Structure of a SARSr-CoV virion

Each SARS-CoV-2 virion is 60–140 nanometres in diameter. Like other coronaviruses, SARS-CoV-2 has four structural proteins, known as the S (spike), E (envelope), M (membrane), and N (nucleocapsid) proteins; the N protein holds the RNA genome, and the S, E, and M proteins together create the viral envelope. Coronavirus S proteins are glycoproteins and also type I membrane proteins (proteins containing a single transmembrane domain oriented on the extracellular side). They are divided into two functional parts (S1 and S2). In SARS-CoV-2, the spike protein, which has been imaged at the atomic level using cryogenic electron microscopy, is the protein responsible for allowing the virus to attach to and fuse with the membrane of a host cell; specifically, its S1 subunit catalyses attachment, the S2 subunit fusion.

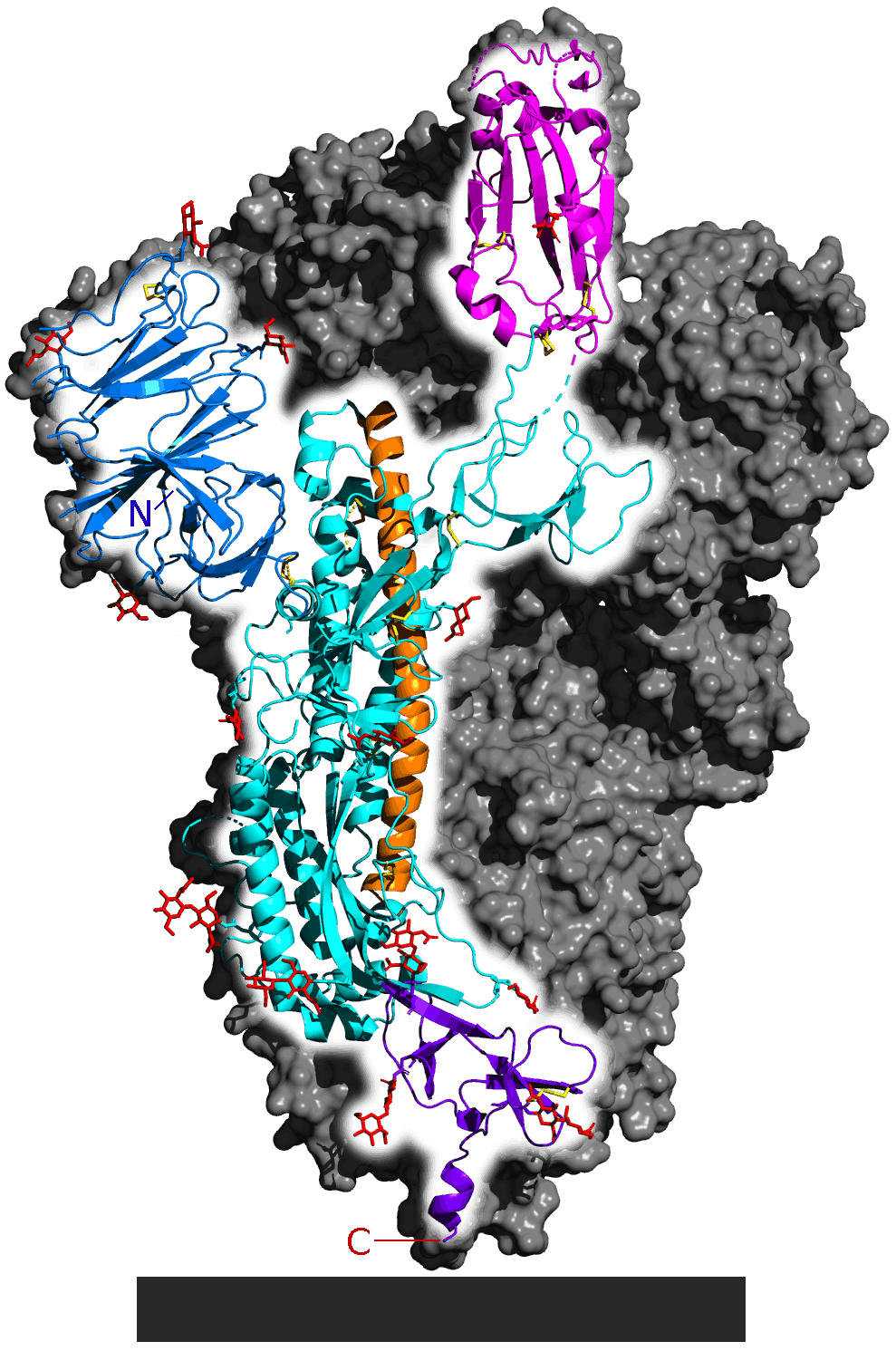
SARS‑CoV‑2 spike homotrimer with one protein subunit highlighted. The ACE2 binding domain is magenta.

=== Genome ===
As of early 2022, about 7 million SARS-CoV-2 genomes had been sequenced and deposited into public databases and another 800,000 or so were added each month. By September 2023, the GISAID EpiCoV database contained more than 16 million genome sequences.

SARS-CoV-2 has a linear, positive-sense, single-stranded RNA genome about 30,000 bases long. Its genome has a bias against cytosine (C) and guanine (G) nucleotides, like other coronaviruses. The genome has the highest composition of U (uracil) (32.2%), followed by A (adenine) (29.9%), and a similar composition of G (19.6%) and C (18.3%). The nucleotide bias arises from the mutation of guanines and cytosines to adenines and uracils, respectively. The mutation of CG dinucleotides is thought to arise to avoid the zinc finger antiviral protein related defence mechanism of cells, and to lower the energy to unbind the genome during replication and translation (adenine and uracil base pair via two hydrogen bonds, cytosine and guanine via three). The depletion of CG dinucleotides in its genome has led the virus to have a noticeable codon usage bias. For instance, arginine's six different codons have a relative synonymous codon usage of AGA (2.67), CGU (1.46), AGG (.81), CGC (.58), CGA (.29), and CGG (.19). A similar codon usage bias trend is seen in other SARS–related coronaviruses.

=== Replication cycle ===
Virus infections start when viral particles bind to host surface cellular receptors. Protein modelling experiments on the spike protein of the virus soon suggested that SARS‑CoV‑2 has sufficient affinity to the receptor angiotensin converting enzyme 2 (ACE2) on human cells to use them as a mechanism of cell entry. By 22 January 2020, a group in China working with the full virus genome and a group in the United States using reverse genetics methods independently and experimentally demonstrated that ACE2 could act as the receptor for SARS‑CoV‑2. Studies have shown that SARS‑CoV‑2 has a higher affinity to human ACE2 than the original SARS virus. SARS‑CoV‑2 may also use basigin to assist in cell entry.

Initial spike protein priming by transmembrane protease, serine 2 (TMPRSS2) is essential for entry of SARS‑CoV‑2. The host protein neuropilin 1 (NRP1) may aid the virus in host cell entry using ACE2. After a SARS‑CoV‑2 virion attaches to a target cell, the cell's TMPRSS2 cuts open the spike protein of the virus, exposing a fusion peptide in the S2 subunit, and the host receptor ACE2. After fusion, an endosome forms around the virion, separating it from the rest of the host cell. The virion escapes when the pH of the endosome drops or when cathepsin, a host cysteine protease, cleaves it. The virion then releases RNA into the cell and forces the cell to produce and disseminate copies of the virus, which infect more cells. Once inside the host cell, the virus replicates rapidly.

SARS‑CoV‑2 produces at least three virulence factors that promote shedding of new virions from host cells and inhibit immune response. Whether they include downregulation of ACE2, as seen in similar coronaviruses, remains under investigation (as of May 2020).

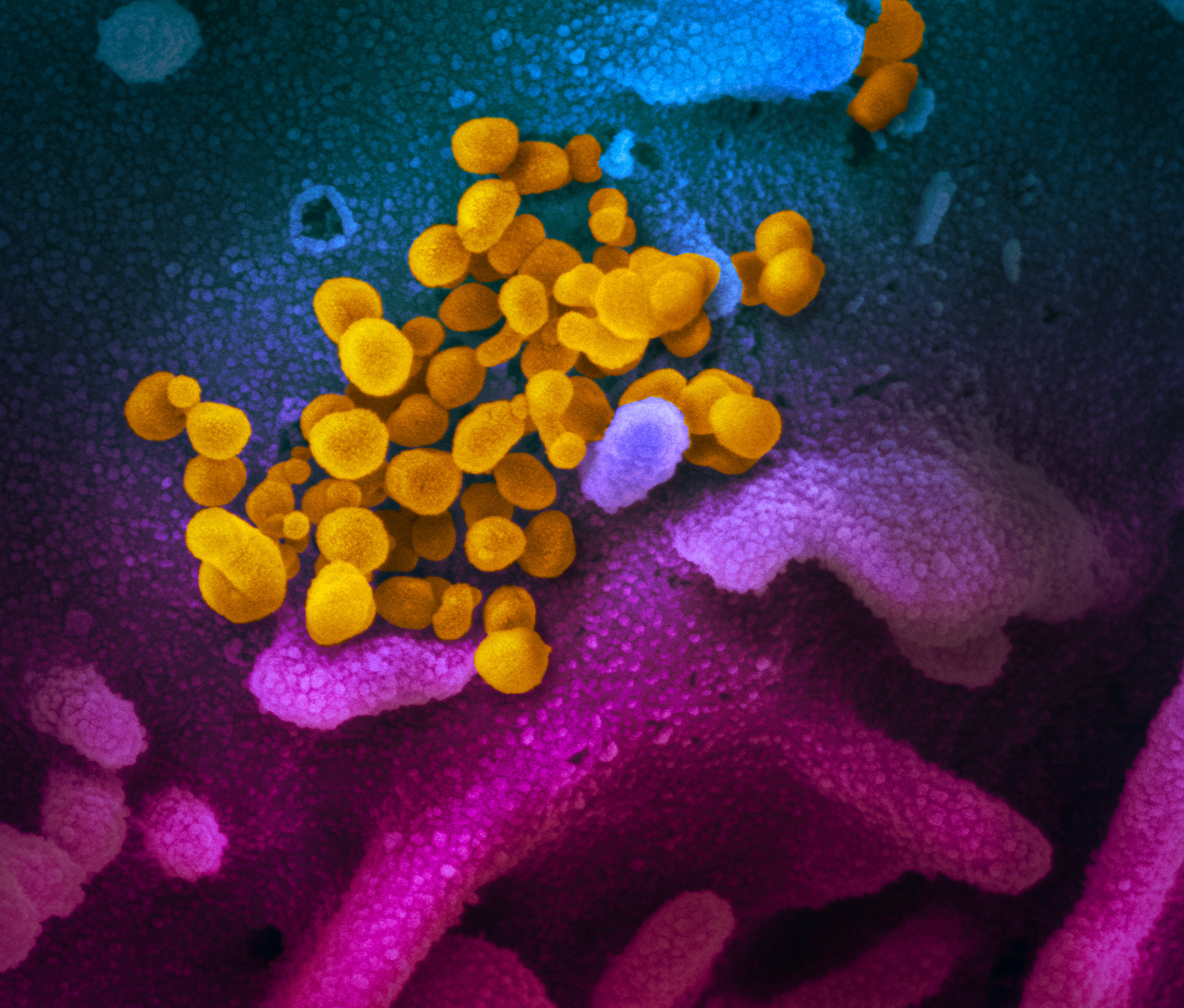
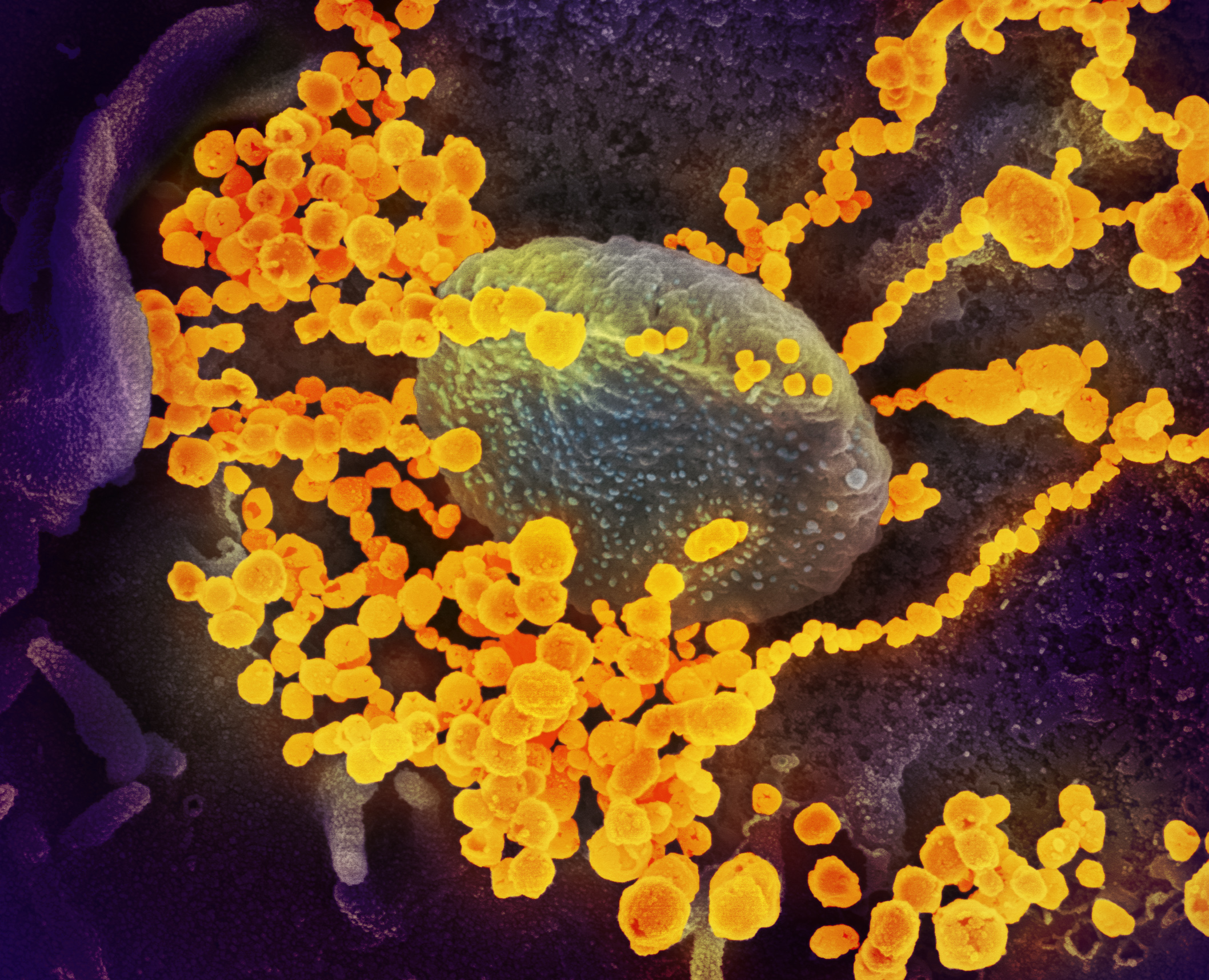
Digitally colourised scanning electron micrographs of SARS-CoV-2 virions (yellow) emerging from human cells cultured in a laboratory

== Treatment and drug development ==
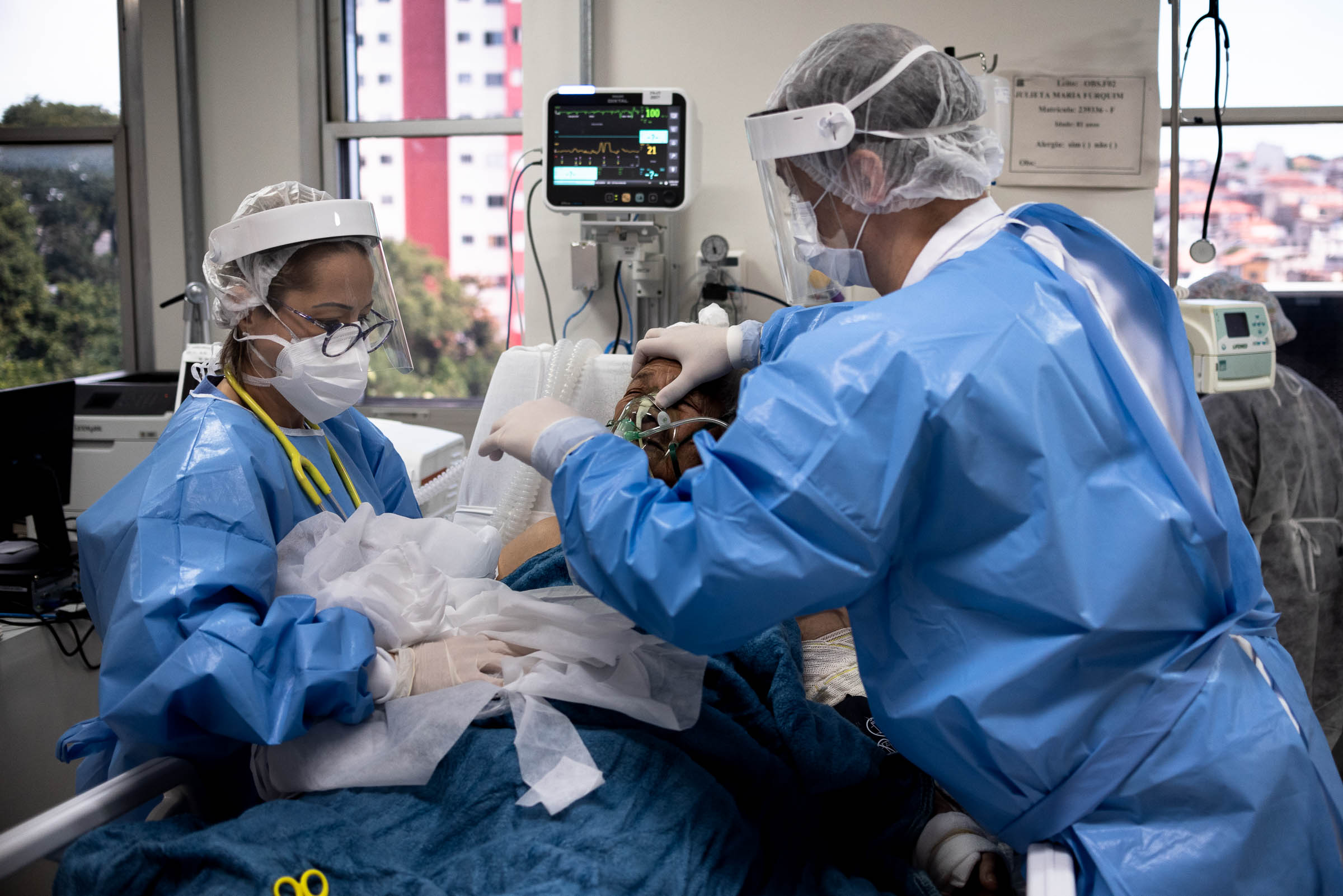
Medical professionals treating a COVID-19 patient in critical condition in an intensive care unit in São Paulo in May 2020.

Very few drugs are known to effectively inhibit SARS‑CoV‑2. Masitinib was found to inhibit SARS-CoV-2 main protease, showing a greater than 200-fold reduction in viral titres in the lungs and nose of mice, however it is not approved for the treatment of COVID-19 in humans. In December 2021, the United States granted emergency use authorisation to Nirmatrelvir/ritonavir for the treatment of the virus; the European Union, United Kingdom, and Canada followed suit with full authorisation soon after. One study found that Nirmatrelvir/ritonavir reduced the risk of hospitalisation and death by 88%.

COVID Moonshot is an international collaborative open-science project started in March 2020 with the goal of developing an un-patented oral antiviral drug for treatment of SARS-CoV-2.

== Epidemiology ==
Retrospective tests collected within the Chinese surveillance system revealed no clear indication of substantial unrecognised circulation of SARS‑CoV‑2 in Wuhan during the latter part of 2019.

A meta-analysis from November 2020 estimated the basic reproduction number ($R_0$) of the wildtype virus to be between 2.39 and 3.44. This means each infection from the virus is expected to result in 2.39 to 3.44 new infections when no members of the community are immune and no preventive measures are taken. The reproduction number may be higher in densely populated conditions such as those found on cruise ships. Human behaviour affects the R0 value and hence estimates of R0 differ between different countries, cultures, and social norms. For instance, one study found relatively low R0 (~3.5) in Sweden, Belgium and the Netherlands, while Spain and the US had significantly higher R0 values (5.9 to 6.4, respectively). The R0 values for later variants were significantly higher, with the Omicron lineage exhibiting the highest R0 by far. The Omicron BA.1 variant had an estimated R0 of around ~9.5.

Reproductive value R0 of SARS-CoV-2 variants
Variant	R0	Source
Reference/ancestral strain	~2.9	
Alpha (B.1.1.7)	3.8–5	
Delta (B.1.617.2)	~5.1 (3–8)	
Omicron BA.1 (B.1.1.529.1)	~9.5	

In the early months of the pandemic, there were 96,000 confirmed cases of infection in mainland China. While the proportion of infections that result in confirmed cases or progress to diagnosable disease was unclear at the time, one mathematical model estimated that 75,815 people were infected on 25 January 2020 in Wuhan alone, at a time when the number of confirmed cases worldwide was only 2,015. Before 24 February 2020, over 95% of all deaths from COVID-19 worldwide had occurred in Hubei province, where Wuhan is located. As of 10 March 2023, the percentage had decreased to 0.047%.

As of 10 March 2023, there were 676,609,955 total confirmed cases of SARS‑CoV‑2 infection. The total number of deaths attributed to the virus was 6,881,955.

== See also ==
- 3C-like protease (NS5)
