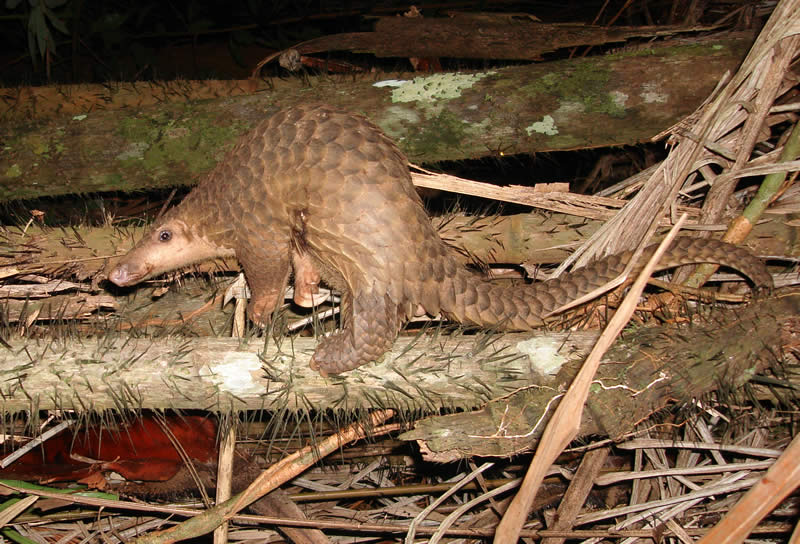

Conservation status
- Critically Endangered (IUCN 3.1)
- CITES Appendix I

Scientific classification
- Kingdom: Animalia
- Phylum: Chordata
- Class: Mammalia
- Order: Pholidota
- Family: Manidae
- Genus: Manis
- Subgenus: Paramanis
- Species: M. javanica

Binomial name
- Manis javanica Desmarest, 1822
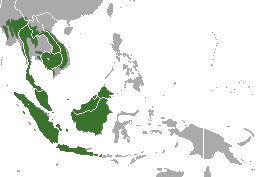
- Sunda pangolin range

= Sunda pangolin =

Species of pangolin found in southeast Asia

The Sunda pangolin (Manis javanica), also known as the Malayan or Javan pangolin, is a species of pangolin. It is a member of the Manidae family. Its English name comes from the Malay name pëngulin, which means "roller".

It is native to Southeast Asia, including Myanmar, Thailand, Cambodia, Laos, Malaysia, Singapore, Vietnam, and the islands of Borneo, Java, Sumatra and the Lesser Sunda Islands. It prefers forested primary, secondary and scrub forest habitats, but also lives in rubber and palm oil plantations. It is largely arboreal.

== Taxonomy ==
In the past, this species has included the closely related Palawan pangolin (M. culionensis), as both are in the subgenus Paramanis. It is closely related to the Chinese pangolin, although the Malayan species is larger, lighter in colour, and has shorter fore claws.

== Phylogeography ==
During the Pilo-Pleistocene, something that has shaped its phylogeographic patterns is the experience of the pangolin geographically and its climate history.

== Description ==
The skin of the Sunda pangolin's feet is granular, although pads are found on its front feet. It has thick and powerful claws to dig into the soils in search of ant nests or to tear into termite mounds. The Sunda pangolin has poor eyesight, but a highly developed sense of smell. Lacking teeth, its long, sticky tongue serves to collect ants and termites. Unlike other mammals, pangolins are covered by rows of scales (made of keratin) and fibrous hair to protect them from danger. The Sunda pangolin's scales are brown in color. Some even have white scales along their tails for an unknown reason.

The head-body length of this pangolin can measure 40–65 cm (16–26 in), tail length is 35–56 cm (14–22 in), and its weight is up to 10 kg (22 lb). Males are larger than females. Mature female Pangolin have needle-like nipples that are used to feed young. The teat does not grow or visibly change when the cub is nursing and is present even before maturity.

It has been suggested that pangolins' olfactory bulbs are enlarged in relation to other mammals. Their use of their snouts and tongues supports that they rely on olfaction to eat. Research has been done on the African tree pangolin (Phataginus tricuspis) that has supported this. Still, the pangolins' auditory systems and visual systems are not exceptionally good. Research has also been done to support the idea that the anatomy of the eyes is well-adapted to allow for nocturnal vision.

== Behaviour and ecology ==
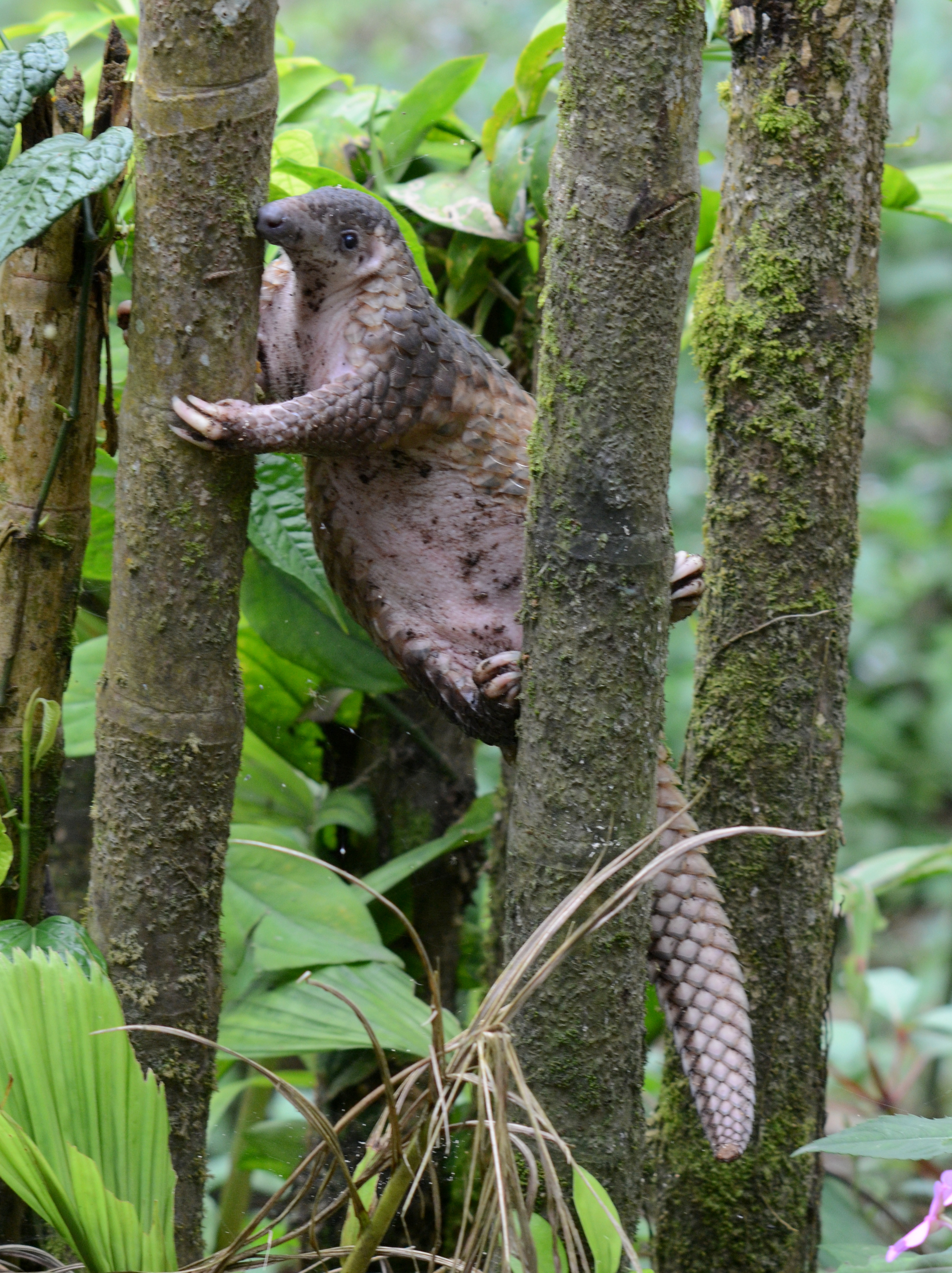
Sunda pangolin climbing a palm tree

Pangolins give birth annually to one or two offspring. They breed in the autumn, and females give birth in the winter burrow. Den preference has been known to shift at this time to favor mature forest tree hollows. Presumably, these hollows offer more fortification and stability for the decreased mobility that comes with birthing and caring for young. The amount of time the mother will spend at any one of these dens will increase during parental care periods. Parental care is given for about three months. In these three months, the range of the mother Pangolin drastically decreases as she travels and forages with her offspring. Only a few weeks before the offspring becomes fully independent, the mother and her young can display brief spikes in diurnal activity. Pangolins are sometimes found in pairs, but normally they are solitary, nocturnal, and behave timidly. They protect their soft underparts by rolling into balls when they feel threatened. They are strong diggers and make burrows lined with vegetation for insulation near termite mounds and ant nests.

Sunda pangolins have low immunity, making them sensitive to fluctuations in temperature.

The Sunda pangolin's main predators are humans, tigers, and the clouded leopard.

Compared to other species of pangolin, Sunda have a much higher distribution across Southeast Asia.

== In culture ==
It is important to the traditions of Orang Asli in the Malay Peninsula and indigenous peoples of Sabah like the Kadazan, Dusun, Murut and Rungus. The Kadazans use its scales to make special armour to protect their warriors.

== Conservation ==
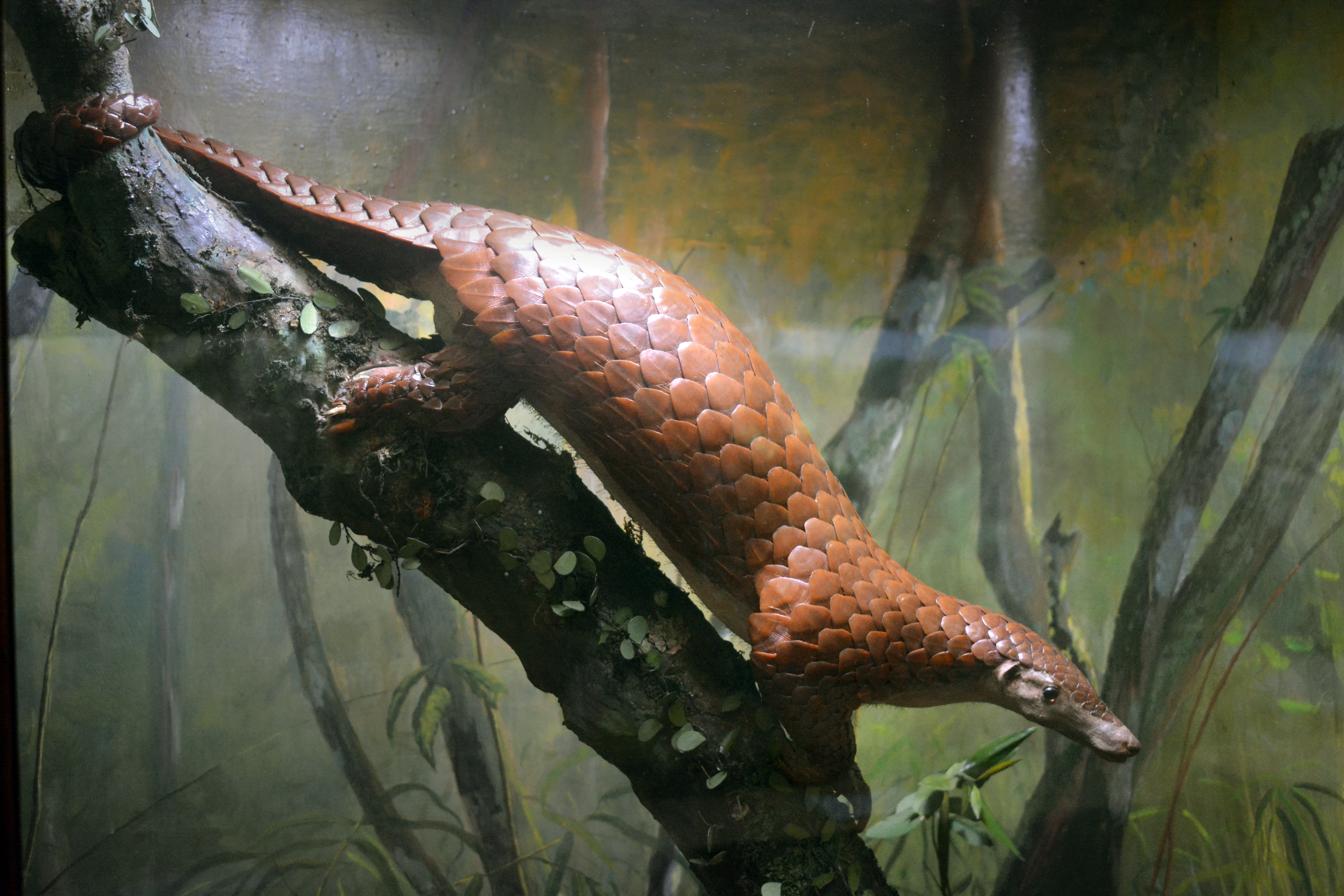
Taxidermy at the Bogor Zoology Museum

Pangolins as a family are among the most protected animals due to heavy poaching, exploitation, and trafficking. Like other pangolin species, the Sunda pangolin is hunted for its skin, scales, and meat, used in both clothing manufacturing and traditional medicine. Scales are made into rings as charms believed to protect against rheumatic fever, and pangolin meat is eaten by indigenous peoples. Despite having protected status almost everywhere in its range, an illegal international trade, largely driven by Chinese buyers, has led to a rapid decrease in population. The Sunda pangolin is currently considered to be critically endangered. As of 2016, all eight pangolin species are listed on CITES Appendix I, which prohibits commercial international trade of wild-caught specimens or their body parts. China raised the protection status of all pangolin species to the highest level in 2020.

Pangolins are also facing habitat loss which has accelerated their population decline. Due to their small population numbers and nocturnal nature, it is difficult for scientists to study them within their natural habitat. Another issue faced by scientists is a lack of knowledge of pangolin behaviour, which hinders the discovery of remaining populations. Pangolins are typically difficult to rehabilitate due to their strict diet requirements.

In the past, captive breeding efforts have yielded little to no success, due in part to the difficulty of rehabilitation, as well as pangolins' nocturnal nature. There is little data on the breeding habits and reproduction rates and, not much is known about pangolin growth and development. However, in recent studies of captive pangolins, researchers found that pangolin cubs were typically able to be weaned off the mother after around 130 days.

While hunting is the primary threat to pangolins across most of Southeast Asia, habitat loss and vehicle collisions are their main dangers in Singapore. Conservation efforts have included the creation of the Sunda Pangolin National Conservation Strategy and Action Plan, and a georeferenced database of pangolin sightings, rescues and roadkills. Husbandry and veterinary techniques have been studied to facilitate rehabilitation of Sunda pangolins.

Current data on all eight species of pangolin is concerning, as all are threatened with extinction.

== Health ==
A metagenomic study published in 2019 previously revealed that SARS-CoV, the strain of the virus that causes SARS, was the most widely distributed coronavirus among a sample of Sunda pangolins. On 7 February 2020, it was announced that researchers from Guangzhou had discovered a pangolin sample with a viral nucleic acid sequence "99% identical" to SARS-CoV-2. When released, the results clarified that "the receptor-binding domain of the S protein of the newly discovered Pangolin-CoV is virtually identical to that of 2019-nCoV, with one amino acid difference." Pangolins are protected under Chinese law, but their poaching and trading for use in traditional Chinese medicine remains common.

Pangolin coronaviruses found to date only share at most 92% of their whole genomes with SARS-CoV-2, making them less similar than RaTG13 to SARS-CoV-2. This is insufficient to prove pangolins to be the intermediate host; in comparison, the SARS virus responsible for the 2002–2004 outbreak shared 99.8% of its genome with a known civet coronavirus.

There is a possibly risk of disease when trading Sunda pangolins. This could effect humans, livestock, and other populations of wildlife. It is known for pangolins to carry disease as several have been found During capturing.
