= Malayan horseshoe bat =

Conservation status
- Least Concern (IUCN 3.1)

Scientific classification
- Kingdom: Animalia
- Phylum: Chordata
- Class: Mammalia
- Order: Chiroptera
- Family: Rhinolophidae
- Genus: Rhinolophus
- Species: R. malayanus

Binomial name
- Rhinolophus malayanus Bonhote, 1903
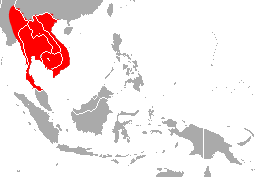
- Malayan horseshoe bat range

Species of bat

The Malayan horseshoe bat (Rhinolophus malayanus) is a species of bat in the family Rhinolophidae. It is found in Cambodia, Laos, Malaysia, Myanmar, Thailand, and Vietnam.
