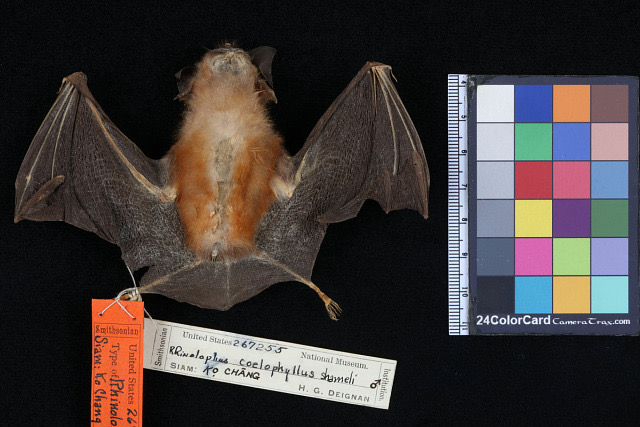
- Specimen

Conservation status
- Least Concern (IUCN 3.1)

Scientific classification
- Kingdom: Animalia
- Phylum: Chordata
- Class: Mammalia
- Infraclass: Placentalia
- Order: Chiroptera
- Family: Rhinolophidae
- Genus: Rhinolophus
- Species: R. shameli

Binomial name
- Rhinolophus shameli Tate, 1943
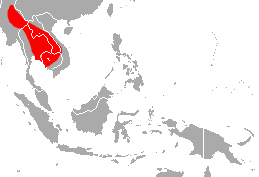
- Shamel's horseshoe bat range

= Shamel's horseshoe bat =

Species of bat

Shamel's horseshoe bat (Rhinolophus shameli) is a species of bat in the family Rhinolophidae. It is found in Cambodia, Laos, Myanmar, Thailand and Vietnam.

The eponym for the species name "shameli" was American mammalogist H. Harold Shamel.
