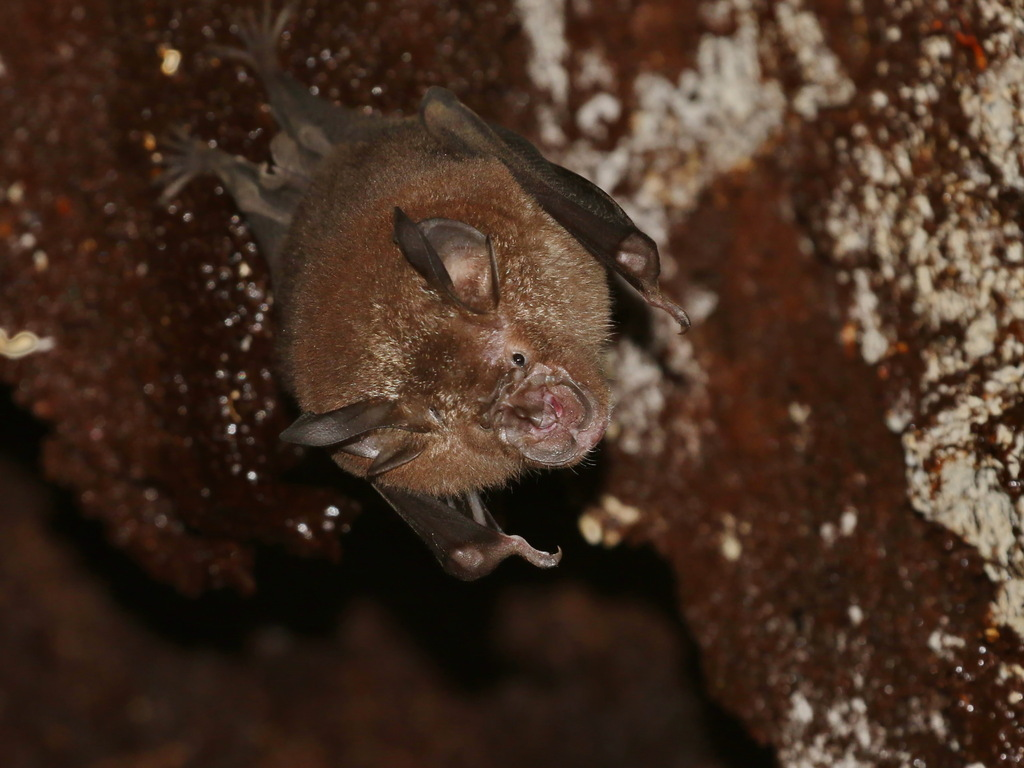

Conservation status
- Least Concern (IUCN 3.1)

Scientific classification
- Kingdom: Animalia
- Phylum: Chordata
- Class: Mammalia
- Infraclass: Placentalia
- Order: Chiroptera
- Family: Rhinolophidae
- Genus: Rhinolophus
- Species: R. pusillus

Binomial name
- Rhinolophus pusillus Temminck, 1834
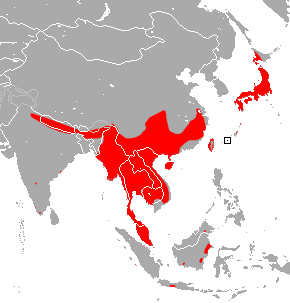
- Least horseshoe bat range

= Least horseshoe bat =

Species of bat

The least horseshoe bat (Rhinolophus pusillus) is a species of bat in the family Rhinolophidae. It is found in Cambodia, China, India, Indonesia, Laos, Malaysia, Myanmar, Nepal, Thailand and Vietnam. It is a food source of the parasite Sinospelaeobdella, a jawed land leech.

== See also ==
- Bats of Asia
- Bats of Southeast Asia
- List of mammals in Hong Kong
