= ORF6 =

Coronavirus gene encoding an accessory protein

Betacoronavirus ORF6 protein
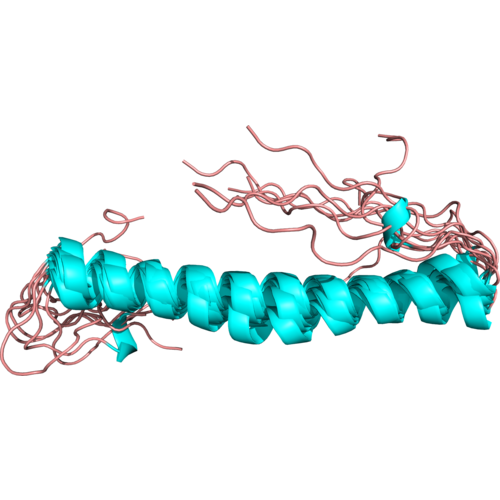
- Top 10 structural models of the SARS-CoV-2's ORF6 protein obtained by Solid-state NMR. The alpha-helix is highlighted in cyan and the disordered regions are coloured in pink. PDB: 9A8Y

Identifiers
- Symbol: bCoV_NS6
- Pfam: PF12133
- InterPro: IPR022736
Available protein structures:
- Pfam: structures / ECOD
- PDB: RCSB PDB; PDBe; PDBj
- PDBsum: structure summary

ORF6 is a gene that encodes a viral accessory protein in coronaviruses of the subgenus Sarbecovirus, including SARS-CoV and SARS-CoV-2. It is not present in MERS-CoV. It is thought to reduce the immune system response to viral infection through interferon antagonism.

== Structure ==
The ORF6 protein is fairly small, consisting of 63 amino acid residues in SARS-CoV and 61 in SARS-CoV-2. The ORF6 sequence is not well conserved, sharing only about 66% of the sequence between the two viruses. However, from the emergence of SARS-CoV-2 in 2019 until 2025, the ORF6 sequence has only stably conserved one mutation: the last aspartate has mutated into a leucine (D61L).

Its approximately 20-residue C-terminal tail is polar, extends into the cytosol. This region contains the conserved Methionine 58 needed for the interaction with RAE1 and NUP98 and signal sequences for protein trafficking. The rest of the protein is amphipathic: the first 10 N-terminal residues act as a membrane anchor, while residues 11-45 form and amphiphilic alpha helix that associates with the membrane as an Integral monotopic membrane protein.

== Expression and localization ==
Like the genes for other accessory proteins, the ORF6 gene is located near those encoding the structural proteins, at the 5' end of the coronavirus RNA genome. Along with ORF7a, ORF7b, and ORF8, ORF6 is located between the membrane (M) and nucleocapsid (N) genes. It is localized to the endoplasmic reticulum and Golgi apparatus, with studies in SARS-CoV-2 also indicating association with vesicles such as autophagosomes and lysosomes.

== Function ==
The primary function of the ORF6 protein is thought to be immunomodulation and interferon antagonism. It is not essential for viral replication, though its absence appears to reduce replication efficiency.

=== Viral protein interactions ===
Studies in SARS-CoV suggest that the ORF6 protein exhibits protein-protein interactions with another viral accessory protein, ORF9b protein. In SARS-CoV, but not in recombinant murine hepatitis virus, ORF6 protein has been detected in virus-like particles and mature virions, suggesting it can be a minor viral structural protein.

=== Immune effects ===
The ORF6 protein from both SARS-CoV and SARS-CoV-2 is an interferon antagonist and thought to be involved in immune evasion. Several protein-protein interactions with host cell proteins have been described to mediate this effect. It has been reported to inhibit nuclear import of the STAT transcription factor, inhibiting interferon activation. Studies of SARS-CoV report this may be mediated by binding of ORF6 protein to karyopherins. In SARS-CoV-2, the ORF6 protein reportedly interacts with RAE1 and NUP98, blocking karyopherin interactions.
