= ORF3a =

Gene found in coronaviruses of the subgenus Sarbecovirus

Betacoronavirus viroporin
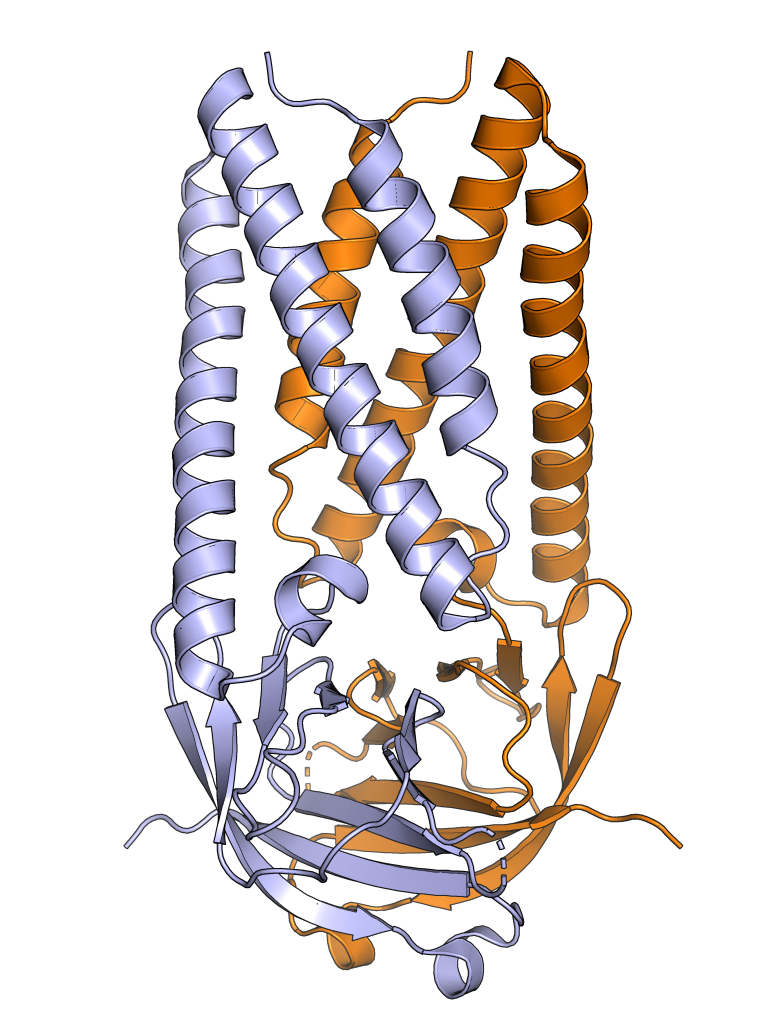
- Cryo-electron microscopy structure of the SARS-CoV-2 ORF3a protein dimer. From PDB: 6XDC.

Identifiers
- Symbol: bCoV_viroporin
- Pfam: PF11289
- InterPro: IPR024407
Available protein structures:
- Pfam: structures / ECOD
- PDB: RCSB PDB; PDBe; PDBj
- PDBsum: structure summary

ORF3a (previously known as X1 or U274) is a gene found in coronaviruses of the subgenus Sarbecovirus, including SARS-CoV and SARS-CoV-2. It encodes an accessory protein about 275 amino acid residues long, which is thought to function as a viroporin. It is the largest accessory protein and was the first of the SARS-CoV accessory proteins to be described.

== Comparative genomics ==
ORF3a is well conserved within the subgenus Sarbecovirus. The protein has 73% sequence identity between SARS-CoV (274 residues) and SARS-CoV-2 (275 residues). Within the ORF3a open reading frame there are several overlapping genes in the genome: ORF3a, ORF3b, and (in SARS-CoV-2 only) ORF3c. In SARS-CoV-2, the overlap between ORF3a, ORF3c, and ORF3d potentially represents a rare example of all three possible reading frames of the same sequence region encoding functional proteins.

Although ORF3a is present in Sarbecovirus, it is absent in another Betacoronavirus subgenus, Embecovirus, which includes the human coronaviruses HKU1 and OC43. It may be distantly related to ORF5 in Merbecovirus, which includes MERS-CoV. Distant homologs of ORF3a have been identified in Alphacoronavirus, which includes the human coronaviruses 229E and NL63, but not in Gammacoronavirus or Deltacoronavirus.

== Structure ==
The ORF3a protein is a transmembrane protein that contains three transmembrane domains. It has an N-terminal ectodomain and C-terminal endodomain, which is separated from the transmembrane domain by a cysteine-rich region. It is thought to function as a dimer or tetramer, which is assembled at the plasma membrane. It may also form higher-order oligomers, with unknown functional effects.

=== Post-translational modifications ===
In SARS-CoV, post-translational modification of ORF3a by O-glycosylation has been observed. In hCoV-NL63, it is N-glycosylated.

== Expression and localization ==
Genomic information
- Genomic organisation of isolate Wuhan-Hu-1, the earliest sequenced sample of SARS-CoV-2, indicating the location of ORF3a
- Genome size: 29,903 bases
- Year of completion: 2020
- Genome browser (UCSC)

Along with the genes for other accessory proteins, the ORF3a gene is located near those encoding the structural proteins, at the 3' end of the coronavirus RNA genome. ORF3a is located between the spike (S) and envelope (E) genes. ORF3a is expressed from the second-largest subgenomic RNA. In SARS-CoV, subcellular localization is diverse and it can be found in the cytoplasm, at the plasma membrane, and in the Golgi apparatus. Its sequence contains protein trafficking signals that target it to the plasma membrane. In hCoV-NL63, it is targeted to the endoplasmic-reticulum–Golgi intermediate compartment (ERGIC).

== Function ==
The ORF3a protein does not appear to be essential for viral replication. From studies with SARS-CoV, there is conflicting evidence on whether or not its deletion reduces replication efficiency.

=== Viroporin ===
The ORF3a protein is thought to form a cation-permeable ion channel. It is believed to function as a viroporin. Along with the envelope protein, it is one of two possible viroporins in SARS-CoV-2, and one of three in SARS-CoV, which encodes the additional possible viroporin ORF8a.

=== Viral protein interactions ===
The ORF3a protein in SARS-CoV has been shown to form protein-protein interactions with several structural proteins - spike protein, membrane protein, and nucleocapsid protein - as well as ORF7a, another accessory protein. Through the cysteine-rich region, it may form disulfide bonds to the spike protein. Incorporation of the ORF3b protein into virions has been observed for SARS-CoV and hCoV-NL63, indicating that it is a viral structural protein.

=== Host cell effects ===
A number of effects of ORF3a on the host cell have been described under experimental conditions. ORF3a has been associated with induction of apoptosis in studies of both SARS-CoV and SARS-CoV-2 in cell culture.

=== Immunogenicity ===
The ORF3a protein is antigenic and antibodies have been observed in patients recovered from infections with SARS-CoV (which causes the disease SARS) or with SARS-CoV-2 (which causes COVID-19).
