= ORF3b =

Gene found in coronaviruses of the subgenus Sarbecovirus

Identifiers
- Organism: SARS-CoV
- Symbol: ORF3b
- UniProt: P59633
Search for
- Structures: Swiss-model
- Domains: InterPro

ORF3b

Identifiers
- Organism: SARS-CoV-2
- Symbol: ORF3b
- UniProt: P0DTF1
Search for
- Structures: Swiss-model
- Domains: InterPro

ORF3b is a gene found in coronaviruses of the subgenus Sarbecovirus, encoding a short non-structural protein. It is present in both SARS-CoV (which causes the disease SARS) and SARS-CoV-2 (which causes COVID-19), though the protein product has very different lengths in the two viruses. The encoded protein is significantly shorter in SARS-CoV-2, at only 22 amino acid residues compared to 153–155 in SARS-CoV. Both the longer SARS-CoV and shorter SARS-CoV-2 proteins have been reported as interferon antagonists. It is unclear whether the SARS-CoV-2 gene expresses a functional protein.

== Nomenclature ==
There has been significant confusion in the scientific literature around the nomenclature used for the accessory proteins of SARS-CoV-2, especially several overlapping genes with ORF3a. Due to differences in the genomes of SARS-CoV and SARS-CoV-2, two distinct open reading frames (ORFs) in the SARS-CoV-2 genome have been referred to as "ORF3b". In SARS-CoV, ORF3b is a gene of 155 codons. In SARS-CoV-2, the homologous region of the genome includes several stop codons in the same reading frame, resulting in a truncated gene of 22 codons. As a result, some papers have used the term "ORF3b" to refer to a later ORF with 57 codons. Exacerbating the confusion, both the 57-codon protein product and the 22-codon protein product have been described to have similar effects as interferon antagonists. In addition, the putative product of yet a third ORF of 41 codons has at least once been described as "3b protein". Numerous publications on SARS-CoV-2 refer ambiguously to "ORF3b".

The recommended nomenclature for SARS-CoV-2 uses the term ORF3b for the 22-codon gene homologous to the 5' end of ORF3b in SARS-CoV. The term ORF3c is used for the 41-codon gene and the term ORF3d is used for the 57-codon gene.

== Comparative genomics ==
Like other genes encoding accessory proteins, ORF3b is located in the genome near the genes encoding viral structural proteins. It is one of several overlapping genes in this region of the genome, overlapping ORF3a and, in SARS-CoV, the E gene encoding the envelope protein. Its length varies significantly, from 22 amino acids in SARS-CoV-2 to around 155 residues in SARS-CoV, with other related bat coronaviruses exhibiting intermediate truncations of varying lengths. It is the only ORF in the Sarbecovirus subgenus with significant length variations among known related viruses. Its sequence is not well conserved within the SARSr-CoV species.

== Expression and localization ==
In SARS-CoV, the ORF3b protein is translated through an internal ribosome entry site (IRES). It has a nuclear localization signal at the C-terminus and has been localized to the nucleolus and mitochondria. It is not essential for viral replication.

In SARS-CoV-2, it is unclear if ORF3b is functional. Proteomics studies, RNA sequencing of subgenomic RNA, ribosome profiling, and comparative genomics have all been used to examine the functional gene content of SARS-CoV-2 and found little evidence that ORF3b expresses a functional protein. The SARS-CoV-2 protein has been reported to localize primarily to the cytosol when expressed in cell culture. Truncated forms of the protein from bat coronaviruses are also reportedly cytosolic, likely due to loss of the C-terminal nuclear localization sequence.

== Function ==
=== Cell growth ===
In SARS-CoV, ORF3b has been reported to induce G0/G1 cell cycle arrest and apoptosis when studied in cell culture.

=== Interferon antagonist ===
In SARS-CoV, ORF3b has been described as an interferon antagonist, suppressing the type I interferon response through inhibition of IRF3. Studies of the truncated SARS-CoV-2 ORF3b protein in cell culture suggest it is a more potent interferon antagonist than the SARS-CoV protein, which may be related to its length and to differences in subcellular localization.

=== Effect on AP-1 ===
In SARS-CoV, ORF3b protein reportedly activates the transcription factor AP-1 through the JNK and ERK signaling pathways.
