= ORF9b =

Gene

Betacoronavirus lipid binding protein
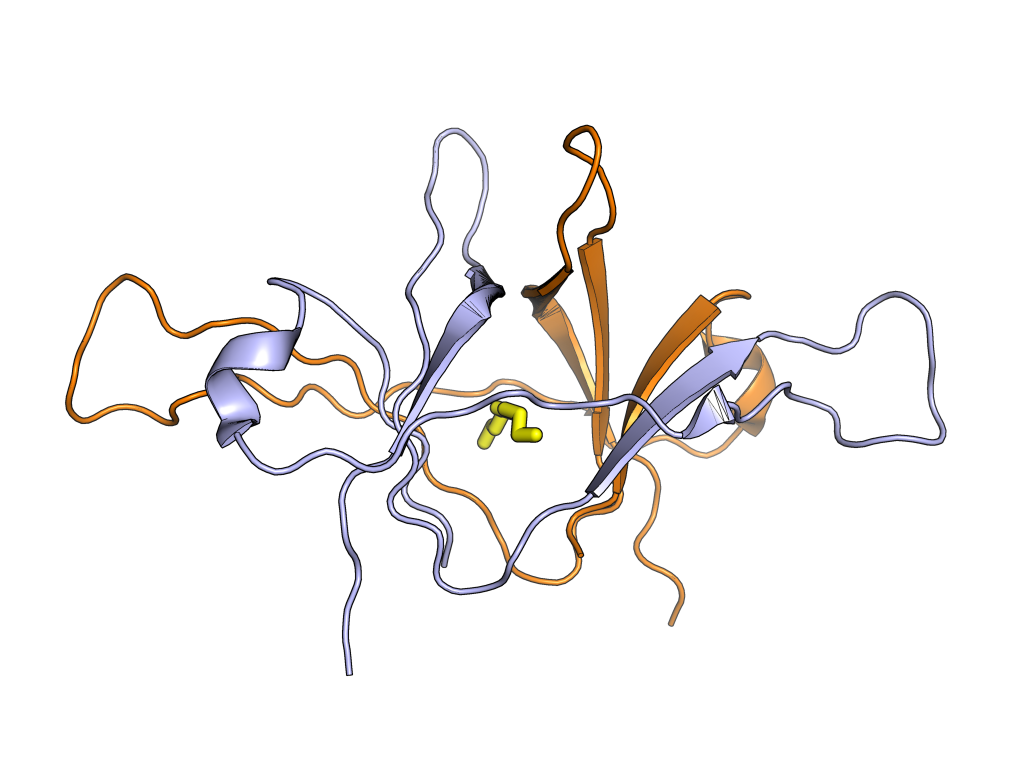
- The X-ray crystallography structure of the SARS-CoV ORF9b protein dimer, showing the lipid molecule in the central cavity (yellow). From PDB: 2CME.

Identifiers
- Symbol: bCoV_lipid_BD
- Pfam: PF09399
- InterPro: IPR018542
Available protein structures:
- PDB: IPR018542 PF09399 (ECOD; PDBsum)
- AlphaFold: IPR018542; PF09399

ORF9b (formerly sometimes called ORF13) is a gene that encodes a viral accessory protein in coronaviruses of the subgenus Sarbecovirus, including SARS-CoV and SARS-CoV-2. It is an overlapping gene whose open reading frame is entirely contained within the N gene, which encodes coronavirus nucleocapsid protein. The encoded protein is 97 amino acid residues long in SARS-CoV and 98 in SARS-CoV-2, in both cases forming a protein dimer.

== Nomenclature ==
There has been inconsistency in the nomenclature used for this gene in the scientific literature. In some work on SARS-CoV, it has been referred to as ORF13. It has also sometimes been referred to as ORF9a, resulting in a downstream ORF of 76 codons in SARS-CoV, also overlapping with the N gene, being designated ORF9b. The recommended nomenclature refers to the longer ORF as 9b and the downstream, shorter ORF as ORF9c.

== Structure ==
The ORF9b protein is 97 amino acid residues long in SARS-CoV and 98 in SARS-CoV-2. It forms a beta sheet-rich homodimer with a hydrophobic cavity in the center that binds lipids. The lipid-binding cavity may serve as an unusual mechanism for anchoring the protein to membranes.

A fragment of the SARS-CoV-2 ORF9b protein has been structurally characterized in a protein complex with Tom70 in which ORF9b forms an alpha helix rather than the beta-sheet structure observed in isolation. This fold switching behavior is also consistent with bioinformatics predictions and may also occur for the SARS-CoV homolog.

== Expression and localization ==
ORF9b is one of two overlapping genes fully contained within the open reading frame of the N gene encoding coronavirus nucleocapsid protein, the other being ORF9c. ORF9b is expressed by ribosome leaky scanning from its bicistronic subgenomic RNA. Unlike its neighbor ORF9c, its length is well conserved in sarbecoviruses and there is strong evidence it is a functional protein-coding gene.

In SARS-CoV, the protein is localized to the endoplasmic reticulum (ER) and to intracellular vesicles. It does not have a nuclear localization sequence but can enter the cell nucleus by passive diffusion; it does however have a nuclear export sequence for exit from the nucleus. In SARS-CoV-2, it is reportedly associated with the mitochondrial membrane.

== Function ==
The function of the ORF9b protein is not well characterized. It is not essential for viral replication.

=== Viral protein interactions ===
The ORF9b protein has been reported to interact with a number of other viral proteins, including ORF6, non-structural protein 5, non-structural protein 14, and coronavirus envelope protein. It has been detected in mature SARS-CoV virions and thus may be a minor viral structural protein.

=== Host cell effects ===
The ORF9b protein may be involved in modulating the host's immune system response. The SARS-CoV-2 protein has been reported to suppress interferon response via its interactions with Tom70, a component of the mitochondrial translocase of the outer membrane (TOM) complex.
