= ORF7a =

Gene found in coronaviruses of the Betacoronavirus genus

Betacoronavirus NS7A protein
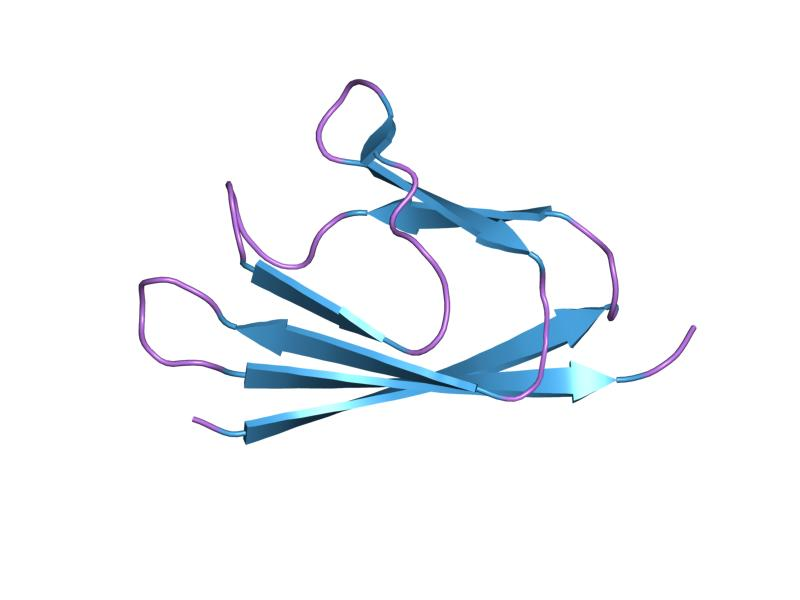
- Structure of the SARS-coronavirus ORF7a accessory protein

Identifiers
- Symbol: bCoV_NS7A
- Pfam: PF08779
- InterPro: IPR014888
Available protein structures:
- PDB: IPR014888 PF08779 (ECOD; PDBsum)
- AlphaFold: IPR014888; PF08779

ORF7a (also known by several other names, including SARS coronavirus X4, SARS-X4, ORF7a, or U122) is a gene found in coronaviruses of the Betacoronavirus genus. It expresses the Betacoronavirus NS7A protein, a type I transmembrane protein with an immunoglobulin-like protein domain. It was first discovered in SARS-CoV, the virus that causes severe acute respiratory syndrome (SARS). The homolog in SARS-CoV-2, the virus that causes COVID-19, has about 85% sequence identity to the SARS-CoV protein.

== Function ==
A number of possible functions for the ORF7a protein have been described. The primary function is thought to be immunomodulation and interferon antagonism. The protein is not essential for viral replication.

=== Viral protein interactions ===
Studies in SARS-CoV suggest that the protein forms protein-protein interactions with spike protein and ORF3a, and is present in mature virions, making it a minor viral structural protein. It is unclear if this occurs in SARS-CoV-2. It may have a role in viral assembly.

=== Host effects ===
A number of interactions with host proteins and effects on host cell processes have been described. The SARS-CoV ORF7a protein has been reported to have binding activity to integrin I domains.

It has also been reported to induce apoptosis via a caspase dependent pathway. Also, it contains a motif which has been demonstrated to mediate COPII dependent transport out of the endoplasmic reticulum, and the protein is targeted to the Golgi apparatus.

In SARS-CoV-2, ORF7a protein has been described as an effective interferon antagonist. The SARS-CoV-2 protein may have immunomodulatory effects through interaction with monocytes.

== Structure ==
The ORF7a protein is a transmembrane protein with 121 amino acid residues in SARS-CoV-2 and 122 in SARS-CoV. It is a type I transmembrane protein with an N-terminal signal peptide, an ectodomain that has an immunoglobulin fold, and a C-terminal endoplasmic reticulum retention signal sequence. The structure contains seven beta strands which form two beta sheets, arranged in a beta sandwich. Most of the sequence differences between SARS-CoV and SARS-CoV-2 occur in the Ig-like ectodomain and may produce differences in protein-protein interactions.

=== Post-translational modifications ===
The SARS-CoV-2 ORF7a protein has been reported to be post-translationally modified by ubiquitination. Polyubiquitin chains attached to lysine 119 may be related to the protein's reported interferon antagonism.

== Expression and localization ==
Genomic information
- Genomic organisation of isolate Wuhan-Hu-1, the earliest sequenced sample of SARS-CoV-2, indicating the location of ORF7a
- Genome size: 29,903 bases
- Year of completion: 2020
- UCSC Genome Browser assembly ID: wuhCor1

Along with the genes for other viral accessory proteins, the ORF7a gene is located near those encoding the viral structural proteins, at the 5' end of the coronavirus RNA genome. ORF7a is an overlapping gene that overlaps ORF7b. In SARS-CoV, subcellular localization to the endoplasmic reticulum, Golgi apparatus, and ERGIC has been reported, with similar Golgi localization described for SARS-CoV-2.

== Evolution ==
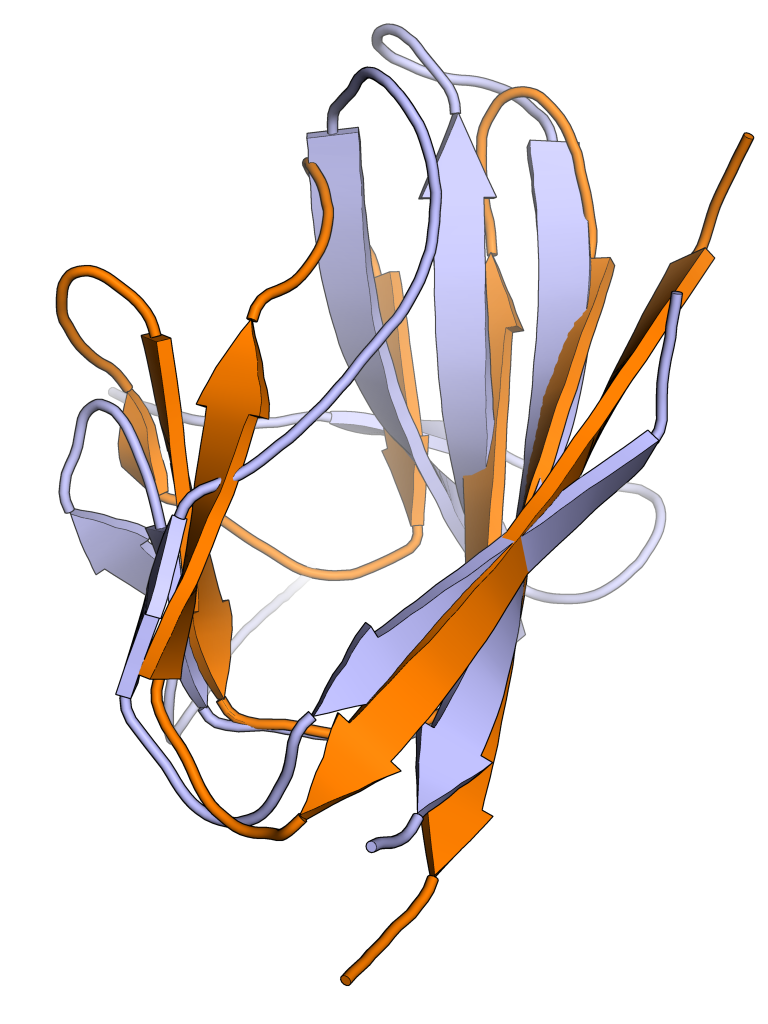
Structural superposition of the Ig domains of ORF8 (blue, PDB: 7JTL) and ORF7a (orange, PDB: 7CI3) illustrating the similarity of their beta-sandwich topologies.

It is thought that ORF8 in SARS-CoV-2, which encodes a protein with a similar Ig-like fold, may be a paralog of ORF7a that originated through gene duplication, though some bioinformatics analyses suggest the similarity may be too low to support duplication, which is relatively uncommon in viruses. Immunoglobulin domains are uncommon in coronaviruses; other than the subset of betacoronaviruses with ORF8 and ORF7a, only a small number of bat alphacoronaviruses have been identified as containing likely Ig domains, while they are absent from gammacoronaviruses and deltacoronaviruses. The beta and alpha Ig domains may be independent acquisitions, where ORF8 and ORF7a may have been acquired from host proteins.

Many SARS-CoV-2 genomes have been sequenced throughout the COVID-19 pandemic and a number of variations have been reported, including deletion mutations, nonsense mutations (introducing a premature stop codon and truncating the protein), and at least one gene fusion. Recent analyses indicate that the repeated knockout of ORF8 in SARS-CoV-2 through deletion mutations is driven by positive selection, suggesting an adaptive advantage for the virus during human infection. The study showed ORF8 deletions were associated with less severe clinical disease.
