= ORF3d =

Gene found in SARS-CoV-2

Identifiers
- Organism: SARS-CoV-2
- Symbol: ORF3d
- UniProt: P0DTG0
Search for
- Structures: Swiss-model
- Domains: InterPro

ORF3d is a gene found in SARS-CoV-2 (the virus that causes COVID-19) and at least one closely related coronavirus found in pangolins, though it is not found in other closely related viruses within the Sarbecovirus subgenus. It is 57 codons long and encodes a novel 57 amino acid residue protein of unknown function. At least two isoforms have been described, of which the shorter 33-residue form, ORF3d-2, may be more highly expressed, or even the only form expressed. It is reported to be antigenic and antibodies to the ORF3d protein occur in patients recovered from COVID-19. There is no homolog in the genome of the otherwise closely related SARS-CoV (which causes the disease SARS).

== Nomenclature ==
There has been significant confusion in the scientific literature around the nomenclature used for the accessory proteins of SARS-CoV-2, especially several overlapping genes with ORF3a. Many scientific papers have referred to ORF3d and its protein product as ORF3b, due to confusion caused by differences in the length of ORF3b in SARS-CoV (about 155 codons) and SARS-CoV-2 (only 22 codons). Exacerbating the confusion, both the 57-codon protein product and the 22-codon protein product have been described to have similar effects as interferon antagonists.

The recommended nomenclature for SARS-CoV-2 uses the term ORF3b for the 22-codon gene homologous to the 5' end of ORF3b in SARS-CoV, and uses the term ORF3d for the 57-codon gene.

== Comparative genomics ==
ORF3d is an overlapping gene whose open reading frame overlaps both ORF3a and ORF3c in the SARS-CoV-2 genome. This potentially represents a rare example of all three possible reading frames of the same sequence region encoding functional proteins. ORF3d is not present in SARS-CoV or other related coronaviruses, except for a coronavirus found in pangolins. SARS-CoV-2 genome sequences have been extensively sampled throughout the COVID-19 pandemic, and examples of SARS-CoV-2 variants with truncations in ORF3d due to the introduction of a stop codon have been identified with relatively high prevalence.

Bioinformatics analysis of the ORF3d region suggests that the sequence of the predicted protein product is not well conserved and raises the possibility that the gene does not encode a functional protein, despite experimental evidence of protein expression.

== Expression ==
The ORF3d protein has two isoforms, one 57 amino acid residues long and one 33 residues long, the latter of which is known as ORF3d-2. There is experimental evidence from studies such as ribosome profiling for expression of at least ORF3d-2, without clear evidence for the full-length ORF3d.

== Function ==
The function of the ORF3d protein is not known, and it is possible that the gene does not code for a protein with any functional role in the viral life cycle. When expressed under experimental conditions in cell culture, the ORF3d protein appears to be an interferon antagonist.

Robust antibody responses to peptides from ORF3d have been reported in patients recovered from COVID-19.
