= ORF9c =

Open reading frame

Betacoronavirus uncharacterised protein 14

Identifiers
- Symbol: bCoV_Orf14
- Pfam: PF17635
- InterPro: IPR035113
Available protein structures:
- PDB: IPR035113 PF17635 (ECOD; PDBsum)
- AlphaFold: IPR035113; PF17635

ORF9c (formerly also called ORF14) is an open reading frame (ORF) in coronavirus genomes of the subgenus Sarbecovirus. It is 73 codons long in the SARS-CoV-2 genome. Although it is often included in lists of Sarbecovirus viral accessory protein genes, experimental and bioinformatics evidence suggests ORF9c may not be a functional protein-coding gene.

== Nomenclature ==
There has been inconsistency in the nomenclature used for this gene in the scientific literature. In some work on SARS-CoV, it has been referred to as ORF14. It has sometimes been referred to as ORF9b, while its longer upstream neighbor ORF9b was given the name ORF9a. The current recommended nomenclature refers to this gene as ORF9c, and the upstream gene as ORF9b.

== Expression and interactions ==
ORF9c is one of two overlapping genes fully contained within the open reading frame of the N gene encoding coronavirus nucleocapsid protein, the other being ORF9b. It is unclear if ORF9c is functionally expressed during SARS-CoV-2 infections; it is reportedly not translated under experimental conditions. When experimentally overexpressed, the protein interacts with sigma receptors and with the NF-kB pathway. The SARS-CoV protein forms self-interactions suggesting protein dimer or higher-order oligomer formation.

== Evolution ==
ORF9c has about 74% sequence identity between SARS-CoV and SARS-CoV-2.

SARS-CoV-2 variants have been identified in which premature stop codons are introduced or where its start codon was lost, and the amino acid sequence is poorly conserved, supporting the hypothesis that it does not encode a functional protein.
