= ORF7b =

Gene found in coronaviruses of the genus Betacoronavirus

Betacoronavirus NS7B protein

Identifiers
- Symbol: bCoV_NS7B
- Pfam: PF11395
- InterPro: IPR021532
Available protein structures:
- PDB: IPR021532 PF11395 (ECOD; PDBsum)
- AlphaFold: IPR021532; PF11395

ORF7b is a gene found in coronaviruses of the genus Betacoronavirus, which expresses the accessory protein Betacoronavirus NS7b protein. It is a short, highly hydrophobic transmembrane protein of unknown function.

== Structure ==
ORF7b protein is a transmembrane protein with a single transmembrane helix whose membrane topology orients the C-terminus in the cytosol. In SARS-CoV, it is 44 amino acid residues and in SARS-CoV-2 it is 43 residues, with about 85% sequence identity.

== Expression and localization ==
ORF7b is an overlapping gene that overlaps ORF7a. The protein is probably expressed from subgenomic RNA through leaky scanning. In SARS-CoV, it is localized to the Golgi apparatus, which requires the transmembrane helix sequence. In SARS-CoV-2, it has been reported to associate with the endoplasmic reticulum.

== Function ==
The function of the ORF7b protein is not well characterized. It is not essential for viral replication, though there is inconsistent evidence from studies of SARS-CoV on whether its deletion affects replication. In SARS-CoV, it has been identified incorporating into virions, suggesting it is a minor viral structural protein. A SARS-CoV-2 variant with a deletion mutation in the ORF7b region, resulting in a fusion protein between ORF7b and ORF8, has been identified, of unclear significance.
