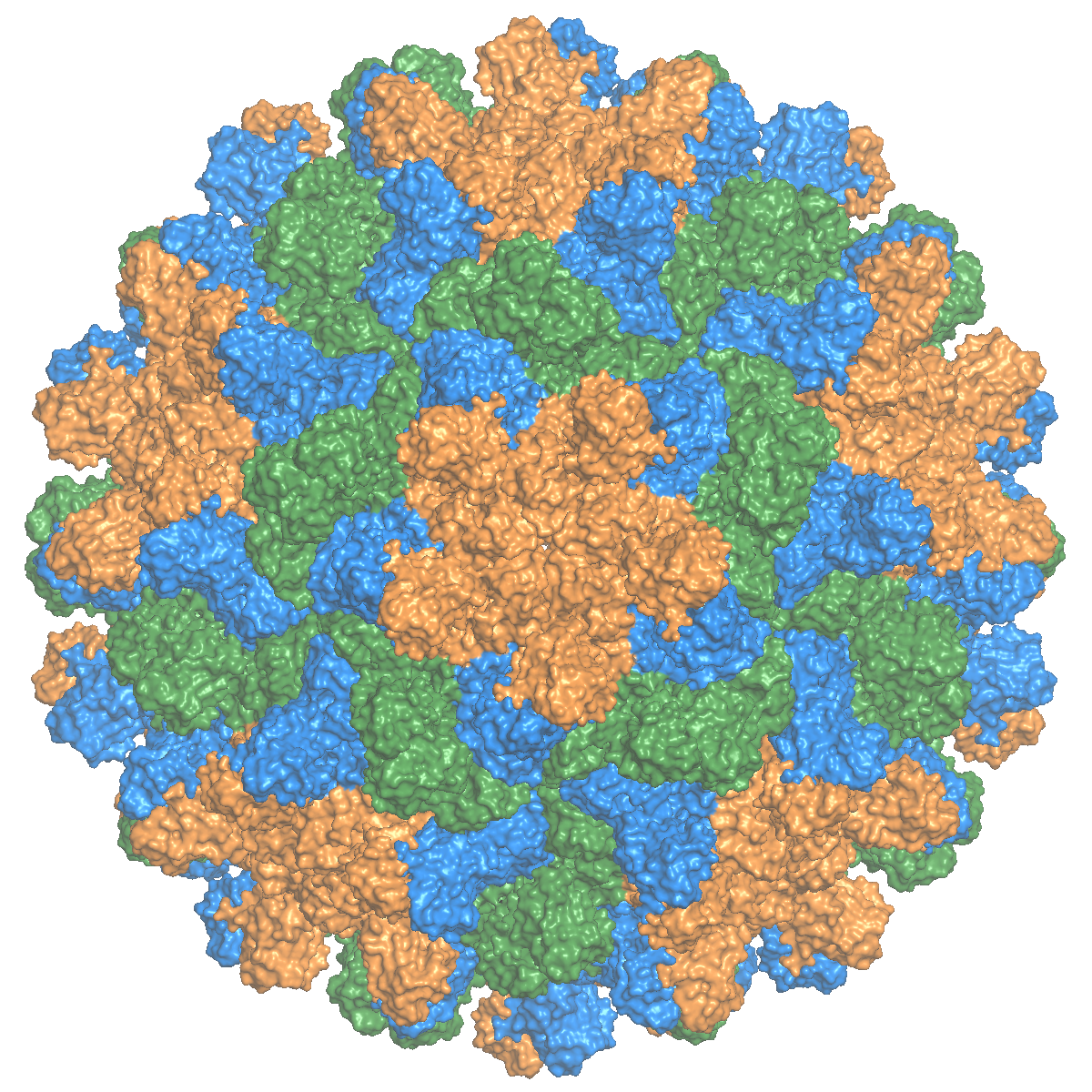
- The capsid of the tomato bushy stunt virus, with the three symmetrically distinct coat protein (p41) monomers colored in orange, green, and blue.

Virus classification
- (unranked): Virus
- Realm: Riboviria
- Kingdom: Orthornavirae
- Phylum: Kitrinoviricota
- Class: Tolucaviricetes
- Order: Tolivirales
- Family: Tombusviridae
- Genus: Tombusvirus
- Species: Tombusvirus lycopersici

= Tomato bushy stunt virus =

Species of virus

Tomato bushy stunt virus (TBSV) is a virus of the tombusvirus family. It was first reported in tomatoes in 1935 and primarily affects vegetable crops, though it is not generally considered an economically significant plant pathogen. Depending upon the host, TBSV causes stunting of growth, leaf mottling, and deformed or absent fruit. The virus is likely to be soil-borne in the natural setting, but can also be transmitted mechanically, for example through contaminated cutting tools. TBSV has been used as a model system in virology research on the life cycle of plant viruses, particularly in experimental infections of the model host plant Nicotiana benthamiana.

== Host range ==
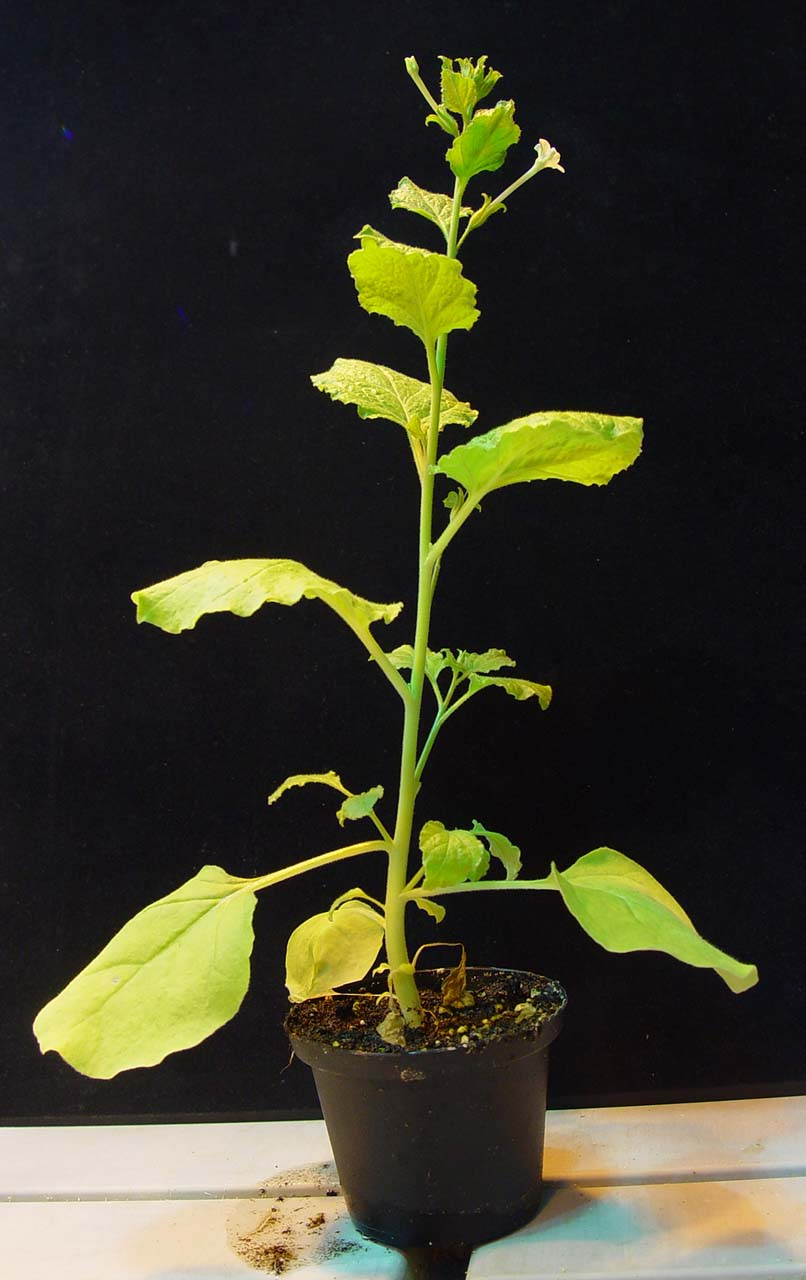
N. benthamiana, a common experimental host for TBSV.

TBSV has a broad host range under experimental conditions and has been reported to infect over 120 plant species spanning 20 families. However, under natural conditions its range is much narrower and generally comprises crop vegetables and ornamental plants. It was first identified in tomato plants and also has been documented to affect apple, artichoke, cherry, grapevine, hops, and pepper. Although it causes significant loss of yield in tomato plants, it is not considered an economically significant pathogen. It is, however, a very well-established model system for the study of plant viruses, usually through experimental infection of Nicotiana benthamiana or Nicotiana clevelandii, relatives of tobacco plants in which TBSV can cause systemic infection. Notably, the common model plant Arabidopsis thaliana is not a host. TBSV can also replicate in yeast in laboratory conditions.

== Signs ==
The signs of TBSV are host-dependent. Local infections can cause necrotic or chlorotic lesions. Systemic infections can cause stunted growth, deformed or absent fruit, and damaged leaves; in agricultural settings yield can be significantly reduced. The stunted, "bushy" appearance of the tomato plants in which the virus was first discovered gave the pathogen its name. In some hosts, most notably N. benthamiana, TBSV can cause lethal systemic necrosis.

== Transmission ==
TBSV is thought to be passively transmitted in the wild, primarily through soil or water. There are no known vector organisms; transmission by aphids, mites, and the fungus Olpidium brassicae has specifically been ruled out. However, the closely related tombusvirus Cucumber necrosis virus (CNV) has been observed to be transmitted by Olpidium bornovanus zoospores, so transmission of TBSV by as-yet unknown vector remains a possibility. TBSV can also be transmitted through seed or by mechanical inoculation. In experimental tests, the virus can survive passage through the human digestive system if consumed in food and will remain infectious; it has been hypothesized that spread through sewage could occur.

== Distribution and management ==
TBSV is distributed fairly widely across central and western Europe, north Africa, and North and South America. No specific control measures are recommended for the virus, though pest management guidelines distributed by the University of California recommend avoiding fields with a history of TBSV or using long crop rotations.

== Taxonomy ==
TBSV is assigned to the Tombusvirus genus in the family Tombusviridae. Both the genus and the family derive their names from an abbreviation of "tomato bushy stunt virus".

== Structure ==
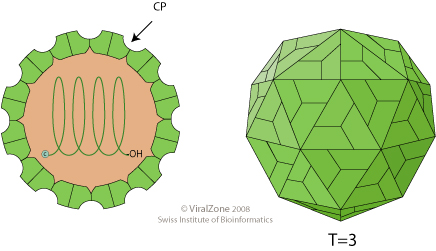
Schematic drawings of a Tombusviridae virion (cross-section and side view)

TBSV is an unenveloped icosahedral virus with a T=3 viral capsid composed of 180 subunits of a single capsid protein. Its structure was studied extensively by X-ray crystallography from the late 1950s; its icosahedral symmetry was first identified by structural biologist Donald Caspar, who also pioneered the study of the tobacco mosaic virus. A near-atomic-resolution map was obtained in 1978 by a research team including Stephen C. Harrison.

== Genome and protein complement ==
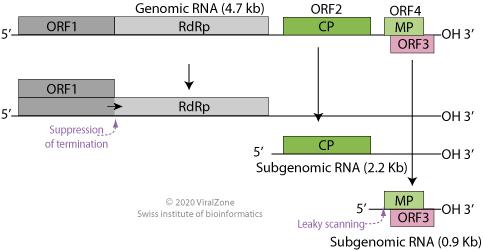
Tombusvirus genome map

TBSV is a positive-sense single-stranded RNA virus with a linear genome of ~4800 nucleotides. The genome contains five genes that encode a replicase composed of two proteins (p33 and p92), a capsid protein (called CP or p41), and two additional proteins, the RNA silencing suppressor p19 and movement protein p22. These two proteins are expressed from overlapping genes arranged so that the open reading frame of p19 is completely within the ORF of p22. The genome contains one additional possible gene, called pX, of unknown function.

=== p33 and p92 ===
Together p33 and p92 comprise the viral replicase complex. P33 is smaller and p92 is produced through ribosomal read-through of the p33 stop codon, resulting in a shared N-terminal amino acid sequence and a large excess of p33 relative to p92. P33 proteins cooperatively bind single-stranded nucleic acids, while the p92 protein is a RNA-dependent RNA polymerase (RdRp). Both are essential to viral proliferation. Both proteins are associated with cell membranes.

=== p41 (capsid protein) ===
The viral capsid protein CP, or p41, is a double jelly roll protein that assembles into an icosahedral capsid containing 180 copies of the protein. Formation of virions is not always necessary for localized spread of the virus into neighboring plant cells, because ribonucleoprotein particles containing viral genetic material can spread to immediate neighbors through plasmodesmata. However, the capsid protein is required for systemic infection.

=== p19 ===
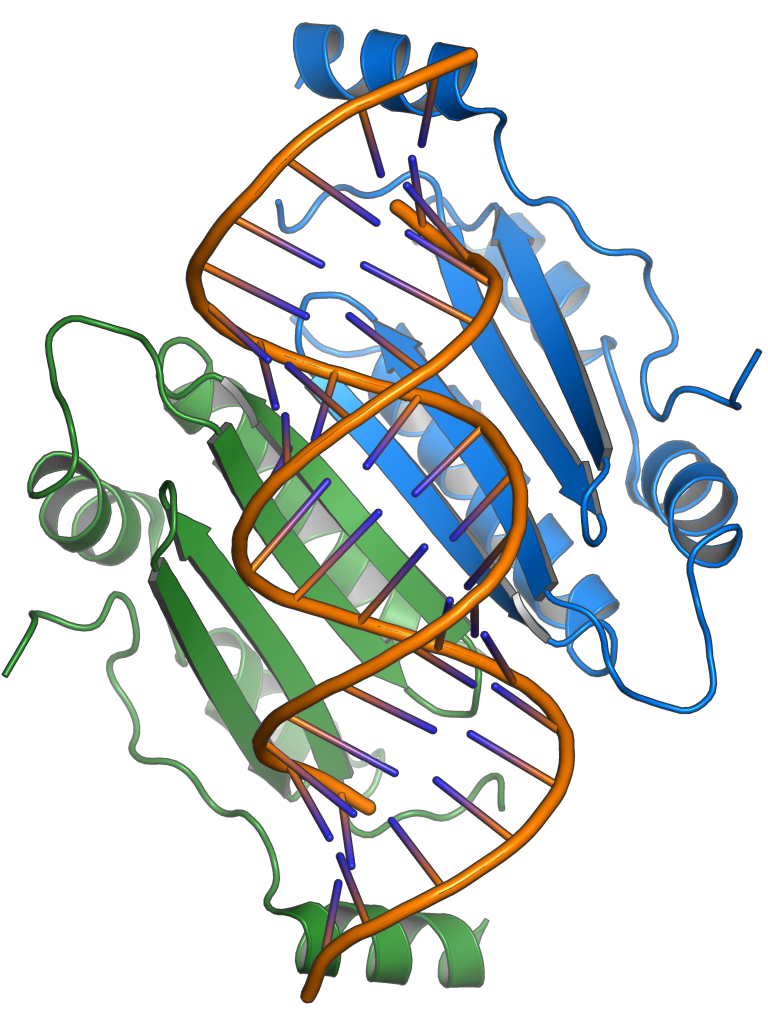
The p19 protein in complex with double-stranded RNA.

The p19 protein is a pathogenicity factor and functions by suppressing the RNA silencing pathway, a common form of antiviral defense. The p19 protein binds short interfering RNAs and prevents their incorporation into the RNA-induced silencing complex (RISC), thereby allowing viral propagation in the host plant. The presence of p19 is necessary for systemic infection or for lethal infection in some hosts; in the experimental host N. benthamiana, p19 largely mediates the lethal systemic necrosis that is the outcome of TBSV infection.

=== p22 ===
The p22 protein is a movement protein that is required for the virus to spread from cell to cell. P22 is an RNA-binding protein that is associated with the cell wall and facilitates movement of viral genetic material from one cell to its neighbor through interconnecting plasmodesmata.

== Replication ==
A TBSV virion contains one copy of its positive-sense single-stranded RNA genome, which is linear and lacks a 3' polyadenine tail or 5' cap. Nevertheless, the p33 and p92 proteins are translated directly from genomic RNA. When the genome is replicated, two subgenomic RNA molecules are produced that act as messenger RNA; one from which the p41 (CP) gene is expressed, and one from the p19 and p22 genes are expressed. The overlapping p19 and p22 genes are both translated through the effects of leaky scanning. Several long-distance interactions between linearly well-separated areas of the genome have been identified with functional importance in ensuring efficient replication.

== Defective interfering RNA ==
Defective interfering RNA (DI) molecules are RNAs that are produced from the viral genome but are not competent to infect cells on their own; instead they require coinfection with an intact "helper" virus. TBSV infections often produce significant numbers of DIs from consistent parts of the genome under experimental conditions, but this behavior has not been observed in the wild. Their production is likely to be host specific. Infections that give rise to DIs usually have milder signs.
