= ORF8 =

Gene that encodes a viral accessory protein

Betacoronavirus NS8 protein
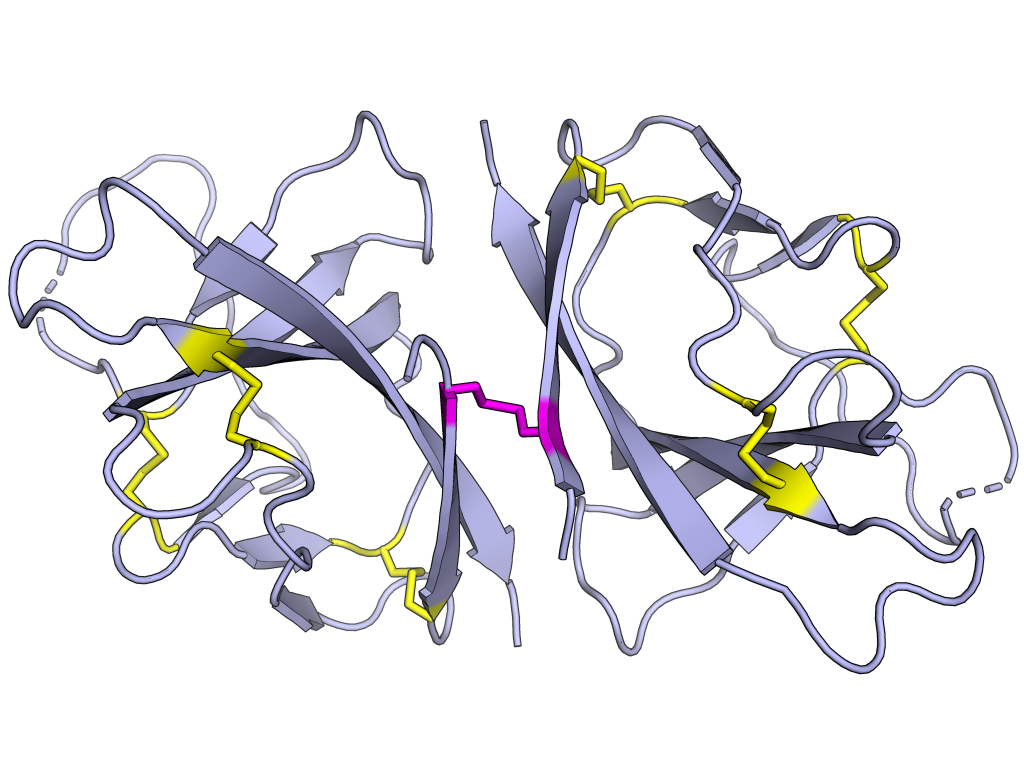
- The SARS-CoV-2 ORF8 protein dimer. Internal disulfide bonds are shown in yellow and the intermolecular disulfide is shown in magenta. From PDB: 7JTL.

Identifiers
- Symbol: bCoV_NS8
- Pfam: PF12093
- InterPro: IPR022722
Available protein structures:
- PDB: IPR022722 PF12093 (ECOD; PDBsum)
- AlphaFold: IPR022722; PF12093

ORF8 is a gene that encodes a viral accessory protein, Betacoronavirus NS8 protein, in coronaviruses of the subgenus Sarbecovirus. It is one of the least well conserved and most variable parts of the genome. In some viruses, a deletion splits the region into two smaller open reading frames, called ORF8a and ORF8b - a feature present in many SARS-CoV viral isolates from later in the SARS epidemic, as well as in some bat coronaviruses. For this reason the full-length gene and its protein are sometimes called ORF8ab. The full-length gene, exemplified in SARS-CoV-2, encodes a protein with an immunoglobulin domain of unknown function, possibly involving interactions with the host immune system. It is similar in structure to the ORF7a protein, suggesting it may have originated through gene duplication.

== Structure ==
ORF8 in SARS-CoV-2 encodes a protein of 121 amino acid residues with an N-terminal signal sequence. ORF8 forms a dimer that is covalently linked by disulfide bonds. It has an immunoglobulin-like domain with distant similarity to the ORF7a protein. Despite a similar overall fold, an insertion in ORF8 likely is responsible for different protein-protein interactions and creates an additional dimerization interface. Unlike ORF7a, ORF8 lacks a transmembrane helix and is therefore not a transmembrane protein, though it has been suggested it might have a membrane-anchored form.

ORF8 in SARS-CoV and SARS-CoV-2 are very divergent, with less than 20% sequence identity. The full-length ORF8 in SARS-CoV encodes a protein of 122 residues. In many SARS-CoV isolates it is split into ORF8a and ORF8b, separately expressing 39-residue ORF8a and 84-residue ORF8b proteins. It has been suggested that the ORF8a and ORF8b proteins may form a protein complex. The cysteine residue responsible for dimerization of the SARS-CoV-2 protein is not conserved in the SARS-CoV sequence. The ORF8ab protein has also been reported to form disulfide-linked multimers.

=== Post-translational modifications ===
The full-length SARS-CoV ORF8ab protein is post-translationally modified by N-glycosylation, which is predicted to be conserved in the SARS-CoV-2 protein. Under experimental conditions, both 8b and 8ab are ubiquitinated.

== Expression and localization ==
Along with the genes for other accessory proteins, the ORF8 gene is located near those encoding the structural proteins, at the 5' end of the coronavirus RNA genome. Along with ORF6, ORF7a, and ORF7b, ORF8 is located between the membrane (M) and nucleocapsid (N) genes. The SARS-CoV-2 ORF8 protein has a signal sequence for trafficking to the endoplasmic reticulum (ER) and has been experimentally localized to the ER. It is probably a secreted protein.

There are variable reports in the literature regarding the localization of SARS-CoV ORF8a, ORF8b, or ORF8ab proteins. It is unclear if ORF8b is expressed at significant levels under natural conditions. The full-length ORF8ab appears to localize to the ER.

== Function ==
The function of the ORF8 protein is unknown. It is not essential for viral replication in either SARS-CoV or SARS-CoV-2, though there is conflicting evidence on whether loss of ORF8 affects the efficiency of viral replication.

A function often suggested for ORF8 protein is interacting with the host immune system. The SARS-CoV-2 protein is thought to have a role in immunomodulation via immune evasion or suppressing host immune responses. It has been reported to be a type I interferon antagonist and to downregulate class I MHC. The SARS-CoV-2 ORF8 protein is highly immunogenic and high levels of antibodies to the protein have been found in patients with or recovered from COVID-19. A study indicates that ORF8 is a transcription inhibitor.

It has been suggested that the SARS-CoV ORF8a protein assembles into multimers and forms a viroporin.

== Evolution ==
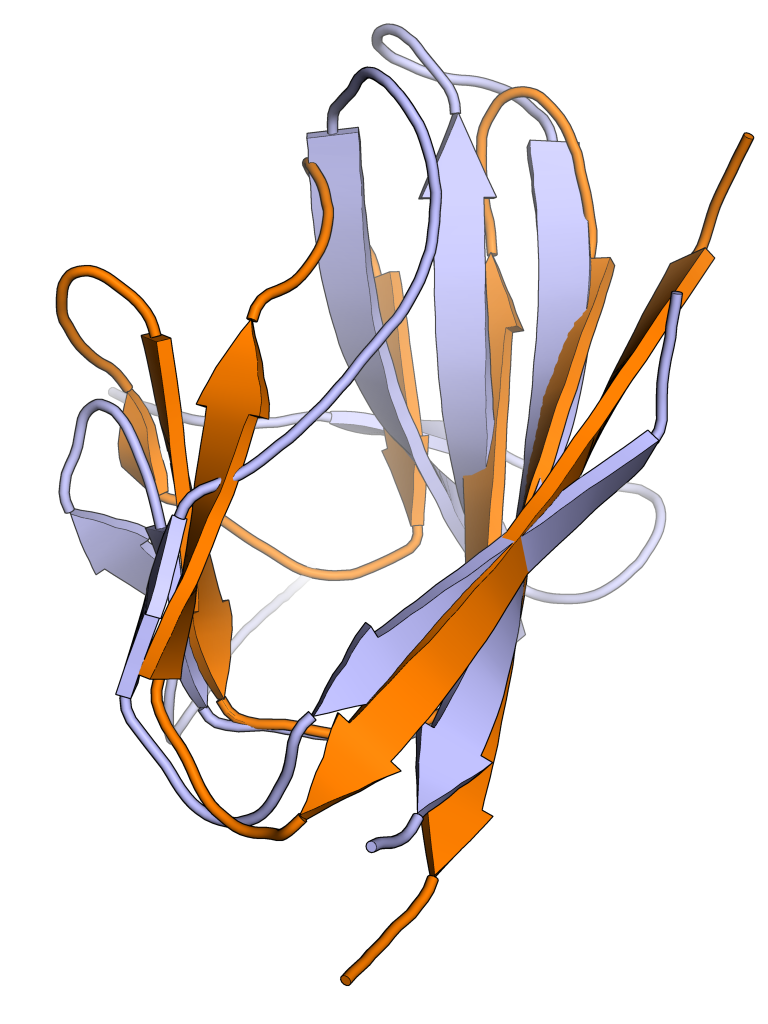
Structural superposition of the Ig domains of ORF8 (blue, PDB: 7JTL) and ORF7a (orange, PDB: 7CI3) illustrating the similarity of their beta-sandwich topologies.

The evolutionary history of ORF8 is complex. It is among the least conserved regions of the Sarbecovirus genome. It is subject to frequent mutations and deletions, and has been described as "hypervariable" and a recombination hotspot. It has been suggested that RNA secondary structures in the region are associated with genomic instability.

In SARS-CoV, the ORF8 region is thought to have originated through recombination among ancestral bat coronaviruses. Among the most distinctive features of this region in SARS-CoV is the emergence of a 29-nucleotide deletion that split the full-length open reading frame into two smaller ORFs, ORF8a and ORF8b. Viral isolates from early in the SARS epidemic have a full-length, intact ORF8, but the split structure emerged later in the epidemic. Similar split structures have since been observed in bat coronaviruses. Mutations and deletions have also been seen in SARS-CoV-2 variants. Based on observations in SARS-CoV, it has been suggested that changes in ORF8 may be related to host adaptation, but it is possible that ORF8 does not affect fitness in human hosts. In SARS-CoV, a high dN/dS ratio has been observed in ORF8, consistent with positive selection or with relaxed selection.

ORF8 encodes a protein whose immunoglobulin domain (Ig) has distant similarity to that of ORF7a. It has been suggested that ORF8 likely have evolved from ORF7a through gene duplication, though some bioinformatics analyses suggest the similarity may be too low to support duplication, which is relatively uncommon in viruses. Immunoglobulin domains are uncommon in coronaviruses; other than the subset of betacoronaviruses with ORF8 and ORF7a, only a small number of bat alphacoronaviruses have been identified as containing likely Ig domains, while they are absent from gammacoronaviruses and deltacoronaviruses. ORF8 is notably absent in MERS-CoV. The beta and alpha Ig domains may be independent acquisitions, where ORF8 and ORF7a may have been acquired from host proteins. It is also possible that the absence of ORF8 reflects gene loss in those lineages.
