= Tombus virus defective interfering (DI) RNA region 3 =

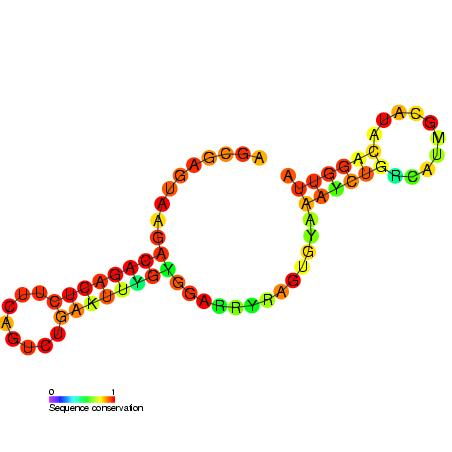
- Predicted secondary structure and sequence conservation of Tombus_3_III

Identifiers
- Symbol: Tombus_3_III
- Rfam: RF00215

Other data
- RNA type: Cis-reg
- Domain(s): Viruses
- SO: SO:0000233
- PDB structures: PDBe

Tombus virus defective interfering (DI) RNA region 3 is an important cis-regulatory region identified in the 3' UTR of Tombusvirus defective interfering particles (DI).

Defective interfering RNAs are small sub-viral replicons which are non-coding deletion mutants of the virus that maintain cis-acting RNA elements necessary for replication of the host virus. This conserved region of the 3'UTR has been found to enhance DI RNA accumulation by approximately 10-fold as well as mediating viral replication.

== See also ==
- Infectious bronchitis virus D-RNA
- Red clover necrotic mosaic virus translation enhancer elements
