= Infectious bronchitis virus D-RNA =

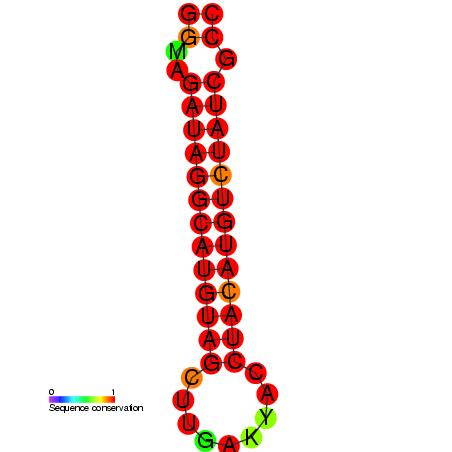
- Predicted secondary structure and sequence conservation of IBV_D-RNA

Identifiers
- Symbol: IBV_D-RNA
- Rfam: RF00385

Other data
- RNA type: Cis-reg
- Domain(s): Viruses
- SO: SO:0000233
- PDB structures: PDBe

The Infectious bronchitis virus D-RNA is an RNA element known as defective RNA or D-RNA. This element is thought to be essential for viral replication and efficient packaging of avian infectious bronchitis virus (IBV) particles.

Coronavirus D-RNA like that of IBV, are produced during high multiplicity of infection and contain cis-acting sequences which are required for viral replication. While it is unclear exactly how IBV D-RNA is made, it is thought to be synthesized in a similar manner as subgenomic mRNA (sg mRNA), with most of the genomic sequence left out of the product. Additionally, sg mRNA can also be synthesized from the IBV D-RNA, although the mechanism of that process is still largely unknown.

IBV D-RNA is often used in the reverse genetics approach to experimentally induce heterologous gene expression and site-specific mutagenesis of the coronavirus genome. However, a translation associated sequence (TAS), which is normally used to transcribe sg mRNA and is derived from gene 5 of the Beaudette strain of IBV, is needed as a promoter to regulate heterologous gene expression. It is also thought that TAS may program some IBV D-RNA to synthesize sg mRNA, which are necessary for homologous gene protein synthesis. In particular, IBV D-RNA CD-61 is used to experimentally produce recombinant IBV vaccines. D-RNA CD-61 was created from the naturally occurring IBV D-RNA CD-91, which is produced by multiple passage of high concentration IBV in chick kidney (CK) cells. The IBV D-RNA CD-61 resulted from deletion mutagenesis of CD-91 and lacks much of the genome but retains the sequences necessary for replication and packaging of viral particles in the presence of a helper virus.

One particularly promising method of IBV D-RNA-mediated heterologous gene expression uses the helper virus dependent system to promote IBV immunity. The helper virus identifies and responds to signals within the IBV D-RNA that are responsible for replication and packaging of IBV particles. Those sequences are thought to be contained within the 5’ and 3’ UTRs of the D-RNA. Analysis of the packaged IBV particles revealed that leader sequence switching occurs between the D-RNA and the IBV helper viruses, which was similarly observed in bovine coronavirus. In addition, it was found that the TAS of the IBV D-RNA contained a consensus sequence that can accept the switched leader sequence and can also be involved in the expression of mRNA from D-RNA.

With the helper virus dependent system, chIFN-gamma-containing IBV D-RNA was successfully used to induce the expression of chicken gamma interferon in IBV-infected CK cells to produce possible immunity against avian IBV, which is a highly infectious pathogen of chickens that causes respiratory, reproductive, and growth complications. It was also shown that biologically active chIFN-gamma was secreted into the allantonic fluid of chicken embryos in vivo, showing that induction of cytokines and, therefore, an immune response, can be induced in living organisms in addition to cultured cells. The use of IBV D-RNA as a vector to create vaccines for IBV is of economic significance. Due to the IBV tropism which specifically targets chickens, recombinant IBV vaccines may provide economical security for poultry farms responsible for egg and meat production around the world.

== See also ==
- Tombus virus defective interfering (DI) RNA region 3
