= Petunia asteroid mosaic virus =

Virus classification
- (unranked): Virus
- Realm: Riboviria
- Kingdom: Orthornavirae
- Phylum: Kitrinoviricota
- Class: Tolucaviricetes
- Order: Tolivirales
- Family: Tombusviridae
- Genus: Tombusvirus
- Species: Tombusvirus petuniae

Synonyms
- tomato bushy stunt virus — Petunia strain PAMV

Species of virus

Petunia asteroid mosaic virus (PetAMV) is a plant pathogenic virus of the family Tombusviridae, infecting grapevine.
