= Carnation Italian ringspot virus =

Virus classification
- (unranked): Virus
- Realm: Riboviria
- Kingdom: Orthornavirae
- Phylum: Kitrinoviricota
- Class: Tolucaviricetes
- Order: Tolivirales
- Family: Tombusviridae
- Genus: Tombusvirus
- Species: Carnation Italian ringspot virus

Species of virus

Carnation Italian ringspot virus (also abbreviated to CIRV) is a virus that is a member of the Tombusviridae family. It can create C-shaped or doughnut-shaped structures that often join with other MVBs in the infected cell. It is found wherever carnations are grown by vegetative multiplication in temperate regions. It is isolated from apple, pear and sour cherry trees in the German Democratic Republic.
