= Tombusvirus =

Virus classification
- (unranked): Virus
- Realm: Riboviria
- Kingdom: Orthornavirae
- Phylum: Kitrinoviricota
- Class: Tolucaviricetes
- Order: Tolivirales
- Family: Tombusviridae
- Subfamily: Procedovirinae
- Genus: Tombusvirus

Genus of viruses

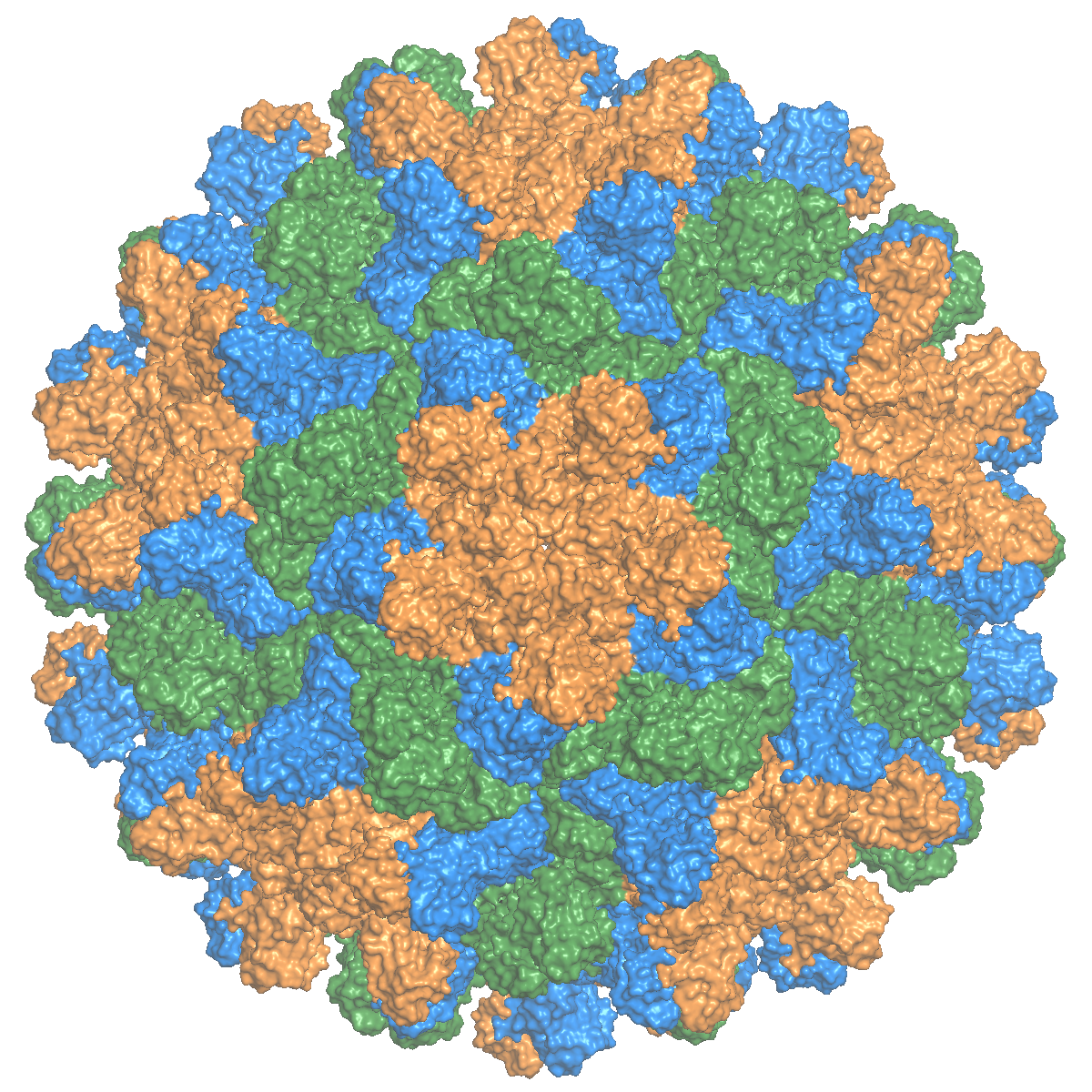
A model of tomato bushy stunt virus, a type of tombusvirus.

Tombusvirus is a genus of viruses, in the family Tombusviridae. Plants serve as natural hosts. There are 17 species in this genus. Symptoms associated with this genus include mosaic. The name of the genus comes from Tomato bushy stunt virus.

== Taxonomy ==
The genus contains the following species, listed by scientific name and followed by their common names:

- Tombusvirus algeriaense, Grapevine Algerian latent virus
- Tombusvirus bulgariaense, Cucumber Bulgarian latent virus
- Tombusvirus cucumis, Cucumber necrosis virus
- Tombusvirus cymbidii, Cymbidium ringspot virus
- Tombusvirus cynarae, Artichoke mottled crinkle virus
- Tombusvirus dianthi, Carnation Italian ringspot virus
- Tombusvirus havelfluminis, Havel River virus
- Tombusvirus latofluminis, Lato River virus
- Tombusvirus limonii, Limonium flower distortion virus
- Tombusvirus lycopersici, Tomato bushy stunt virus
- Tombusvirus melongenae, Eggplant mottled crinkle virus
- Tombusvirus moroccoense, Moroccan pepper virus
- Tombusvirus neckarfluminis, Neckar River virus
- Tombusvirus necropelargonii, Pelargonium necrotic spot virus
- Tombusvirus pelargonii, Pelargonium leaf curl virus
- Tombusvirus petuniae, Petunia asteroid mosaic virus
- Tombusvirus siktefluminis, Sikte waterborne virus

== Structure ==
Viruses in Tombusvirus are non-enveloped, with icosahedral and spherical geometries, and T=3 symmetry. The diameter is around 28-34 nm. Genomes are linear and non-segmented, positive sense, single-stranded RNA, around 4-5.4kb in length. These virions have a regular surface structure and are composed of 17% nucleic acid.

Genus	Structure	Symmetry	Capsid	Genomic arrangement	Genomic segmentation
Tombusvirus	Icosahedral	T=3	Non-enveloped	Linear	Monopartite

== Life cycle ==
Viral replication is cytoplasmic, and is lysogenic. Entry into the host cell is achieved by penetration into the host cell. Replication follows the positive stranded RNA virus replication model. Positive stranded RNA virus transcription, using the premature termination model of subgenomic RNA transcription is the method of transcription. Translation takes place by suppression of termination. The virus exits the host cell by tubule-guided viral movement. Plants serve as the natural host. Transmission routes are mechanical, seed borne, and contact.

Genus	Host details	Tissue tropism	Entry details	Release details	Replication site	Assembly site	Transmission
Tombusvirus	Plants	None	Viral movement; mechanical inoculation	Viral movement	Cytoplasm	Cytoplasm	Mechanical: contact; seed

The virus uses the cis-regulatory elements, Tombus virus defective interfering (DI) RNA region 3 and Tombusvirus 5' UTR to control expression of defective interfering RNAs and viral RNA replication.
