= Immunomodulation =

Modulation of the immune system

Immunomodulation is modulation (regulatory adjustment) of the immune system. It has natural and human-induced forms, and thus the word can refer to the following:

- Homeostasis in the immune system, whereby the system self-regulates to adjust immune responses to adaptive rather than maladaptive levels (using regulatory T cells, cell signaling molecules, and so forth)
- Immunomodulation as part of immunotherapy, in which immune responses are induced, amplified, attenuated, or prevented according to therapeutic goals.

== See also ==
- Immunomodulation in osseointegration
