= RNA silencing =

Gene silencing by means of RNA

RNA silencing or RNA interference refers to a family of gene silencing effects by which gene expression is negatively regulated by non-coding RNAs such as microRNAs. RNA silencing may also be defined as sequence-specific regulation of gene expression triggered by double-stranded RNA (dsRNA). RNA silencing mechanisms are conserved among most eukaryotes. The most common and well-studied example is RNA interference (RNAi), in which endogenously expressed microRNA (miRNA) or exogenously derived small interfering RNA (siRNA) induces the degradation of complementary messenger RNA. Other classes of small RNA have been identified, including piwi-interacting RNA (piRNA) and its subspecies repeat associated small interfering RNA (rasiRNA).

== Background ==
RNA silencing describes several mechanistically related pathways which are involved in controlling and regulating gene expression. RNA silencing pathways are associated with the regulatory activity of small non-coding RNAs (approximately 20–30 nucleotides in length) that function as factors involved in inactivating homologous sequences, promoting endonuclease activity, translational arrest, and/or chromatic or DNA modification. In the context in which the phenomenon was first studied, small RNA was found to play an important role in defending plants against viruses. For example, these studies demonstrated that enzymes detect double-stranded RNA (dsRNA) not normally found in cells and digest it into small pieces that are not able to cause disease.

While some functions of RNA silencing and its machinery are understood, many are not. For example, RNA silencing has been shown to be important in the regulation of development and in the control of transposition events. RNA silencing has been shown to play a role in antiviral protection in plants as well as insects. Also in yeast, RNA silencing has been shown to maintain heterochromatin structure. However, the varied and nuanced role of RNA silencing in the regulation of gene expression remains an ongoing scientific inquiry. A range of diverse functions have been proposed for a growing number of characterized small RNA sequences—e.g., regulation of developmental, neuronal cell fate, cell death, proliferation, fat storage, haematopoietic cell fate, insulin secretion.

RNA silencing functions by repressing translation or by cleaving messenger RNA (mRNA), depending on the amount of complementarity of base-pairing. RNA has been largely investigated within its role as an intermediary in the translation of genes into proteins. More active regulatory functions, however, only began to be addressed by researchers beginning in the late-1990s. The landmark study providing an understanding of the first identified mechanism was published in 1998 by Fire et al., demonstrating that double-stranded RNA could act as a trigger for gene silencing. Since then, various other classes of RNA silencing have been identified and characterized. Presently, the therapeutic potential of these discoveries is being explored, for example, in the context of targeted gene therapy.

While RNA silencing is an evolving class of mechanisms, a common theme is the fundamental relationship between small RNAs and gene expression. It has also been observed that the major RNA silencing pathways currently identified have mechanisms of action which may involve both post-transcriptional gene silencing (PTGS) as well as chromatin-dependent gene silencing (CDGS) pathways. CDGS involves the assembly of small RNA complexes on nascent transcripts and is regarded as encompassing mechanisms of action which implicate transcriptional gene silencing (TGS) and co-transcriptional gene silencing (CTGS) events. This is significant at least because the evidence suggests that small RNAs play a role in the modulation of chromatin structure and TGS.

Despite early focus in the literature on RNA interference (RNAi) as a core mechanism which occurs at the level of messenger RNA translation, others have since been identified in the broader family of conserved RNA silencing pathways acting at the DNA and chromatin level. RNA silencing refers to the silencing activity of a range of small RNAs and is generally regarded as a broader category than RNAi. While the terms have sometimes been used interchangeably in the literature, RNAi is generally regarded as a branch of RNA silencing. To the extent it is useful to craft a distinction between these related concepts, RNA silencing may be thought of as referring to the broader scheme of small RNA related controls involved in gene expression and the protection of the genome against mobile repetitive DNA sequences, retroelements, and transposons to the extent that these can induce mutations. The molecular mechanisms for RNA silencing were initially studied in plants but have since broadened to cover a variety of subjects, from fungi to mammals, providing strong evidence that these pathways are highly conserved.

At least three primary classes of small RNA have currently been identified, namely: small interfering RNA (siRNA), microRNA (miRNA), and piwi-interacting RNA (piRNA).

=== Small interfering RNA (siRNA) ===
siRNAs act in the nucleus and the cytoplasm and are involved in RNAi as well as CDGS. siRNAs come from long dsRNA precursors derived from a variety of single-stranded RNA (ssRNA) precursors, such as sense and antisense RNAs. siRNAs also come from hairpin RNAs derived from transcription of inverted repeat regions. siRNAs may also arise enzymatically from non-coding RNA precursors. The volume of literature on siRNA within the framework of RNAi is extensive. One of the potent applications of siRNAs is the ability to distinguish the target versus non-target sequence with a single-nucleotide difference. This approach has been considered as therapeutically crucial for the silencing dominant gain-of-function (GOF) disorders, where mutant allele causing disease is differed from wt-allele by a single nucleotide (nt). This type of siRNAs with capability to distinguish a single-nt difference are termed as allele-specific siRNAs.

=== microRNA (miRNA) ===
The majority of miRNAs act in the cytoplasm and mediate mRNA degradation or translational arrest. However, some plant miRNAs have been shown to act directly to promote DNA methylation. miRNAs come from hairpin precursors generated by the RNaseIII enzymes Drosha and Dicer. Both miRNA and siRNA form either the RNA-induced silencing complex (RISC) or the nuclear form of RISC known as RNA-induced transcriptional silencing complex (RITS). The volume of literature on miRNA within the framework of RNAi is extensive.

=== Three prime untranslated regions and microRNAs ===
Three prime untranslated regions (3'UTRs) of messenger RNAs (mRNAs) often contain regulatory sequences that post-transcriptionally cause RNA interference. Such 3'-UTRs often contain both binding sites for microRNAs (miRNAs) as well as for regulatory proteins. By binding to specific sites within the 3'-UTR, miRNAs can decrease gene expression of various mRNAs by either inhibiting translation or directly causing degradation of the transcript. The 3'-UTR also may have silencer regions that bind repressor proteins that inhibit the expression of a mRNA.

The 3'-UTR often contains microRNA response elements (MREs). MREs are sequences to which miRNAs bind. These are prevalent motifs within 3'-UTRs. Among all regulatory motifs within the 3'-UTRs (e.g. including silencer regions), MREs make up about half of the motifs.

As of 2014, the miRBase web site, an archive of miRNA sequences and annotations, listed 28,645 entries in 233 biologic species. Of these, 1,881 miRNAs were in annotated human miRNA loci. miRNAs were predicted to have an average of about four hundred target mRNAs (affecting expression of several hundred genes). Freidman et al. estimate that >45,000 miRNA target sites within human mRNA 3'UTRs are conserved above background levels, and >60% of human protein-coding genes have been under selective pressure to maintain pairing to miRNAs.

Direct experiments show that a single miRNA can reduce the stability of hundreds of unique mRNAs. Other experiments show that a single miRNA may repress the production of hundreds of proteins, but that this repression often is relatively mild (less than 2-fold).

The effects of miRNA dysregulation of gene expression seem to be important in cancer. For instance, in gastrointestinal cancers, nine miRNAs have been identified as epigenetically altered and effective in down regulating DNA repair enzymes.

The effects of miRNA dysregulation of gene expression also seem to be important in neuropsychiatric disorders, such as schizophrenia, bipolar disorder, major depression, Parkinson's disease, Alzheimer's disease and autism spectrum disorders.

=== piwi-interacting RNA (piRNA) ===
piRNAs represent the largest class of small non-coding RNA molecules expressed in animal cells, deriving from a large variety of sources, including repetitive DNA and transposons. However, the biogenesis of piRNAs is also the least well understood. piRNAs appear to act both at the post-transcriptional and chromatin levels. They are distinct from miRNA due to at least an increase in terms of size and complexity. Repeat associated small interfering RNA (rasiRNAs) are considered to be a subspecies of piRNA.

== Mechanism ==
MiRNA processing

The most basic mechanistic flow for RNA Silencing is as follows: (For a more detailed explanation of the mechanism, refer to the RNAi:Cellular mechanism article.)

1: RNA with inverted repeats hairpin/panhandle constructs --> 2: dsRNA --> 3: miRNAs/siRNAs --> 4: RISC --> 5: Destruction of target mRNA

1. It has been discovered that the best precursor to good RNA silencing is to have single stranded antisense RNA with inverted repeats which, in turn, build small hairpin RNA and panhandle constructs. The hairpin or panhandle constructs exist so that the RNA can remain independent and not anneal with other RNA strands.
2. These small hairpin RNAs and/or panhandles then get transported from the nucleus to the cytosol through the nuclear export receptor called exportin-5, and then get transformed into a dsRNA, a double stranded RNA, which, like DNA, is a double stranded series of nucleotides. If the mechanism didn't use dsRNAs, but only single strands, there would be a higher chance for it to hybridize to other "good" mRNAs. As a double strand, it can be kept on call for when it is needed.
3. The dsRNA then gets cut up by a Dicer into small (21-28 nt = nucleotides long) strands of miRNAs (microRNAs) or siRNAs (short interfering RNAs.) A Dicer is an endoribonuclease RNase, which is a complex of a protein mixed with strand(s) of RNA.
4. Lastly, the double stranded miRNAs/siRNAs separate into single strands; the antisense RNA strand of the two will combine with another endoribonuclease enzyme complex called RISC (RNA-induced silencing complex), which includes the catalytic component Argonaute, and will guide the RISC to break up the "perfectly complementary" target mRNA or viral genomic RNA so that it can be destroyed.
5. It means that based on a short sequence specific area, a corresponding mRNA will be cut. To make sure, it will be cut in many other places as well. (If the mechanism only worked with a long stretch, then there would be higher chance that it would not have time to match to its complementary long mRNA.) It has also been shown that the repeated-associated short interference RNAs (rasiRNA) have a role in guiding chromatin modification.

== Biological functions ==
=== Immunity against viruses or transposons ===
RNA silencing is the mechanism that our cells (and cells from all kingdoms) use to fight RNA viruses and transposons (which originate from our own cells as well as from other vehicles). In the case of RNA viruses, these get destroyed immediately by the mechanism cited above. In the case of transposons, it's a little more indirect. Since transposons are located in different parts of the genome, the different transcriptions from the different promoters produce complementary mRNAs that can hybridize with each other. When this happens, the RNAi machinery goes into action, debilitating the mRNAs of the proteins that would be required to move the transposons themselves.

=== Down-regulation of genes ===
For a detailed explanation of the down-regulation of genes, see RNAi:downregulation of genes

=== Up-regulation of genes ===
For a detailed explanation of the up-regulation of genes, see RNAi:upregulation of genes

=== RNA silencing also gets regulated ===
The same way that RNA silencing regulates downstream target mRNAs, RNA silencing itself is regulated. For example, silencing signals get spread between cells by a group of enzymes called RdRPs (RNA-dependent RNA polymerases) or RDRs.

== Practical applications ==
Growing understanding of small RNA gene-silencing mechanisms involving dsRNA-mediated sequence-specific mRNA degradation has directly impacted the fields of functional genomics, biomedicine, and experimental biology. The following section describes various applications involving the effects of RNA silencing. These include uses in biotechnology, therapeutics, and laboratory research. Bioinformatics techniques are also being applied to identify and characterize large numbers of small RNAs and their targets.

=== Biotechnology ===
Artificial introduction of long dsRNAs or siRNAs has been adopted as a tool to inactivate gene expression, both in cultured cells and in living organisms. Structural and functional resolution of small RNAs as the effectors of RNA silencing has had a direct impact on experimental biology. For example, dsRNA may be synthesized to have a specific sequence complementary to a gene of interest. Once introduced into a cell or biological system, it is recognized as exogenous genetic material and activates the corresponding RNA silencing pathway. This mechanism can be used to effect decreases in gene expression with respect to the target, useful for investigating loss of function for genes relative to a phenotype. That is, studying the phenotypic and/or physiologic effects of expression decreases can reveal the role of a gene product. The observable effects can be nuanced, such that some methods can distinguish between “knockdown” (decrease expression) and “knockout” (eliminate expression) of a gene. RNA interference technologies have been noted recently as one of the most widely utilized techniques in functional genomics. Screens developed using small RNAs have been used to identify genes involved in fundamental processes such as cell division, apoptosis and fat regulation.

=== Biomedicine ===
Since at least the mid-2000s, there has been intensifying interest in developing short interfering RNAs for biomedical and therapeutic applications. Bolstering this interest is a growing number of experiments which have successfully demonstrated the clinical potential and safety of small RNAs for combatting diseases ranging from viral infections to cancer as well as neurodegenerative disorders. In 2004, the first Investigational New Drug applications for siRNA were filed in the United States with the Food and Drug Administration; it was intended as a therapy for age-related macular degeneration. RNA silencing in vitro and in vivo has been accomplished by creating triggers (nucleic acids that induce RNAi) either via expression in viruses or synthesis of oligonucleotides. Optimistically many studies indicate that small RNA-based therapies may offer novel and potent weapons against pathogens and diseases where small molecule/pharmacologic and vaccine/biologic treatments have failed or proved less effective in the past. However, it is also warned that the design and delivery of small RNA effector molecules should be carefully considered in order to ensure safety and efficacy.

The role of RNA silencing in therapeutics, clinical medicine, and diagnostics is a fast developing area and it is expected that in the next few years some of the compounds using this technology will reach market approval. A report has been summarized below to highlight the many clinical domains in which RNA silencing is playing an increasingly important role, chief among them are ocular and retinal disorders, cancer, kidney disorders, LDL lowering, and antiviral. The following table displays a listing of RNAi based therapy currently in various phases of clinical trials. The status of these trials can be monitored on the ClinicalTrials.gov website, a service of the National Institutes of Health (NIH). Of note are treatments in development for ocular and retinal disorders, that were among the first compounds to reach clinical development. AGN211745 (sirna027) (Allergan) and bevasiranib (Cand5) (Opko) underwent clinical development for the treatment of age-related macular degeneration, but trials were terminated before the compounds reached the market. Other compounds in development for ocular conditions include SYL040012 (Sylentis) and QPI-007 (Quark). SYL040012 (bamosinan) is a drug candidate under clinical development for glaucoma, a progressive optic neurdegeneration frequently associated to increased intraocular pressure; QPI-007 is a candidate for the treatment of angle-closure glaucoma and Non-arteritic anterior ischaemic optic neuropathy; both compounds are currently undergoing phase II clinical trials. Several compounds are also under development for conditions such as cancer and rare diseases.

Clinical domain	Drug	Indication	Target
Ocular and retinal disorders	TD101	Pachyonychia congenita	Keratin 6A N171K mutant
Ocular and retinal disorders	QPI-1007	Non-arteritic anterior ischaemic optic neuropathy	Caspase 2
Ocular and retinal disorders	AGN211745	Age-related macular degeneration, choroidal neovascularization	VEGFR1
Ocular and retinal disorders	PF-655	Diabetic macular oedema, age-related macular degeneration	RTP801
Ocular and retinal disorders	SYL040012	Glaucoma	β2 adrenergic receptor
Ocular and retinal disorders	Bevasiranib	Diabetic macular oedema	VEGF
Ocular and retinal disorders	Bevasiranib	Macular degeneration	VEGF
Cancer	CEQ508	Familial adenomatous polyposis	β-catenin
Cancer	ALN-PLK1	Liver tumor	PLK1
Cancer	FANG	Solid tumor	Furin
Cancer	CALAA-01	Solid tumor	RRM2
Cancer	SPC2996	chronic lymphocytic leukemia	BCL-2
Cancer	ALN-VSP02	Solid tumor	VEGF, kinesin spindle protein
Cancer	NCT00672542	Metastatic melanoma	LMP2, LMP7, and MECL1
Cancer	Atu027	Solid malignancies	PKN3
Kidney disorders	QPI-1002/I5NP	Acute kidney injury	p53
Kidney disorders	QPI-1002/I5NP	Graft dysfunction kidney transplant	p53
Kidney disorders	QPI-1002/I5NP	Kidney injury acute renal failure	p53
LDL lowering	TKM-ApoB	Hypercholesterolaemia	APOB
LDL lowering	PRO-040,201	Hypercholesterolaemia	APOB
Antiviral	miravirsen	Hepatitis C virus	miR-122
Antiviral	pHIV7-shI-TAR-CCR5RZ	HIV	HIV Tat protein, HIV TAR RNA, human CCR5
Antiviral	ALN-RSV01	RSV	RSV nucleocapsid
Antiviral	ALN-RSV01	RSV in lung transplant patients	RSV nucleocapsid

=== Main challenge ===
As with conventional manufactured drugs, the main challenge in developing successful offshoots of the RNAi-based drugs is the precise delivery of the RNAi triggers to where they are needed in the body. The reason that the ocular macular degeneration antidote was successful sooner than the antidote with other diseases is that the eyeball is almost a closed system, and the serum can be injected with a needle exactly where it needs to be. The future successful drugs will be the ones who are able to land where needed, probably with the help of nanobots. Below is a rendition of a table that shows the existing means of delivery of the RNAi triggers.

Species/formulation	Packaging capacity	Applications and considerations
Viral vector
Adenovirus	Usually < 10 Kb	dsDNA vector with large packaging capacity, transient expression, highly immunogenic
Adeno-associated virus (AAV)	~4.5Kb	ssDNA vector, small packaging capacity, mildly immunogenic, lasting expression in non-dividing cells, capsid pseudotyping/engineering facilitates specific cell-targeting
Lentivirus	Up to 13.5 Kb	RNA vector, integration competent and incompetent forms available, less immunogenic than adenovirus or AAV, envelope pseudo typing facilitates cell targeting, clinical production more difficult than for adenovirus or AAV
Herpes simplexvirus	150 Kb	DNA vector, episomal, lasting expression, immunogenic
Bacterial vector species (bacterial minicells can carry plasmids, siRNAs or drugs)
Escherichis coli, S. Typhymurium		Delivery of short hairpin RNA or siRNA to gut tissue
Non-viral formulations
Nanoparticle		Self-assembling, may target specific receptors, requires technical expertise to prepare
Stable nucleic acid lipid particle (SNALP)		Stable for systemic delivery, broad cell-type delivery
Aptamer		Targeting of specific receptors, requires sophisticated screening to develop
Cholesterol		Stable for systemic delivery, broad cell-type delivery

=== Laboratory ===
The scientific community has been quick to harness RNA silencing as a research tool. The strategic targeting of mRNA can provide a large amount of information about gene function and its ability to be turned on and off. Induced RNA silencing can serve as a controlled method for suppressing gene expression. Since the machinery is conserved across most eukaryotes, these experiments scale well to a range of model organisms. In practice, expressing synthetic short hairpin RNAs can be used to reach stable knock-down. If promoters can be made to express these designer short hairpin RNAs, the result is often potent, stable, and controlled gene knock-down in both in vitro and in vivo contexts. Short hairpin RNA vector systems can be seen as roughly analogous in scope to using cDNA overexpression systems. Overall, synthetic and natural small RNAs have proven to be an important tool for studying gene function in cells as well as animals.

Bioinformatics approaches to identify small RNAs and their targets have returned several hundred, if not thousands of, small RNA candidates predicted to affect gene expression in plants, C. elegans, D. melanogaster, zebrafish, mouse, rat, and human. These methods are largely directed to identifying small RNA candidates for knock-out experiments but may have broader applications. One bioinformatics approach evaluated sequence conservation criteria by filtering seed complementary target-binding sites. The cited study predicted that approximately one third of mammalian genes were to be regulated by, in this case, miRNAs.

=== Ethics & Risk-Benefit Analysis ===
One aspect of RNA silencing to consider is its possible off-target affects, toxicity, and delivery methods. If RNA silencing is to become a conventional drug, it must first pass the typical ethical issues of biomedicine. Using risk-benefit analysis, researchers can determine whether RNA silencing conforms to ethical ideologies such as nonmaleficence, beneficence, and autonomy.

There is a risk of creating infection-competent viruses that could infect non-consenting people. There is also a risk of affecting future generations based on these treatments. These two scenarios, in respect to autonomy, is possible unethical. At this moment, unsafe delivery methods and unintended aspects of vector viruses add to the argument against RNA silencing.

In terms of off-target effects, siRNA can induce innate interferon responses, inhibit endogenous miRNAs through saturation, and may have complementary sequences to other non-target mRNAs. These off-targets could also have target up-regulations such as oncogenes and antiapoptotic genes. The toxicity of RNA silencing is still under review as there are conflicting reports.

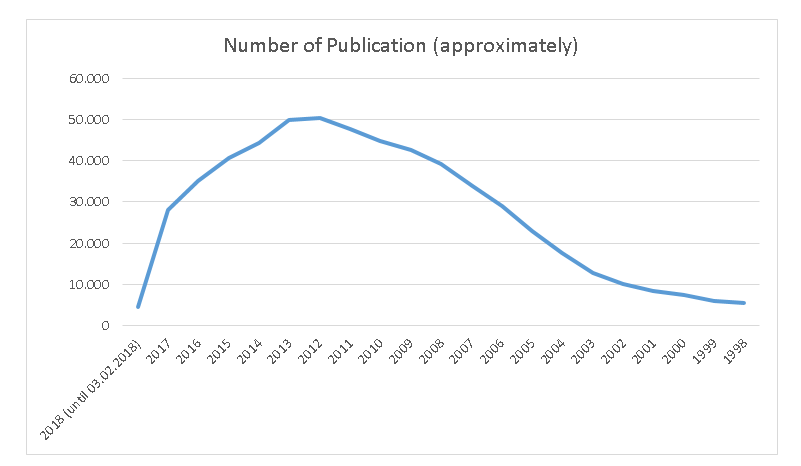
Number of RNAi publications since 1998

RNA silencing is quickly developing, because of that, the ethical issues need to be discussed further. With the knowledge of general ethical principles, we must continuously perform risk-benefit analysis.

== See also ==
- RNAi
- siRNA
- miRNA
- piwiRNA
- rasiRNA
