= Viral structural protein =

A viral structural protein is a viral protein that is a structural component of the mature virus.

Examples include the SARS coronavirus 3a and 7a accessory proteins.

== Bacteriophage T4 structural proteins ==
During assembly of the bacteriophage (phage) T4 virion, the structural proteins encoded by the phage genes interact with each other in a characteristic sequence. Maintaining an appropriate balance in the amounts of each of these structural proteins produced during viral infection appears to be critical for normal phage T4 morphogenesis. Phage T4 encoded proteins that determine virion structure include major structural components, minor structural components and non-structural proteins that catalyze specific steps in the morphogenesis sequence. Phage T4 morphogenesis is divided into three independent pathways: the head, the tail and the long tail fibres as detailed by Yap and Rossman.

== See also ==
- Viral nonstructural protein
