= Viral regulatory and accessory protein =

Category of auxiliary viral proteins

A viral regulatory and accessory protein is a type of viral protein that can play an indirect role in the function of a virus.

An example is Nef.
