= Huanan Seafood Wholesale Market =

Market in Wuhan, Hubei, China

Wuhan Huanan Seafood Wholesale Market 武汉华南海鲜批发市场
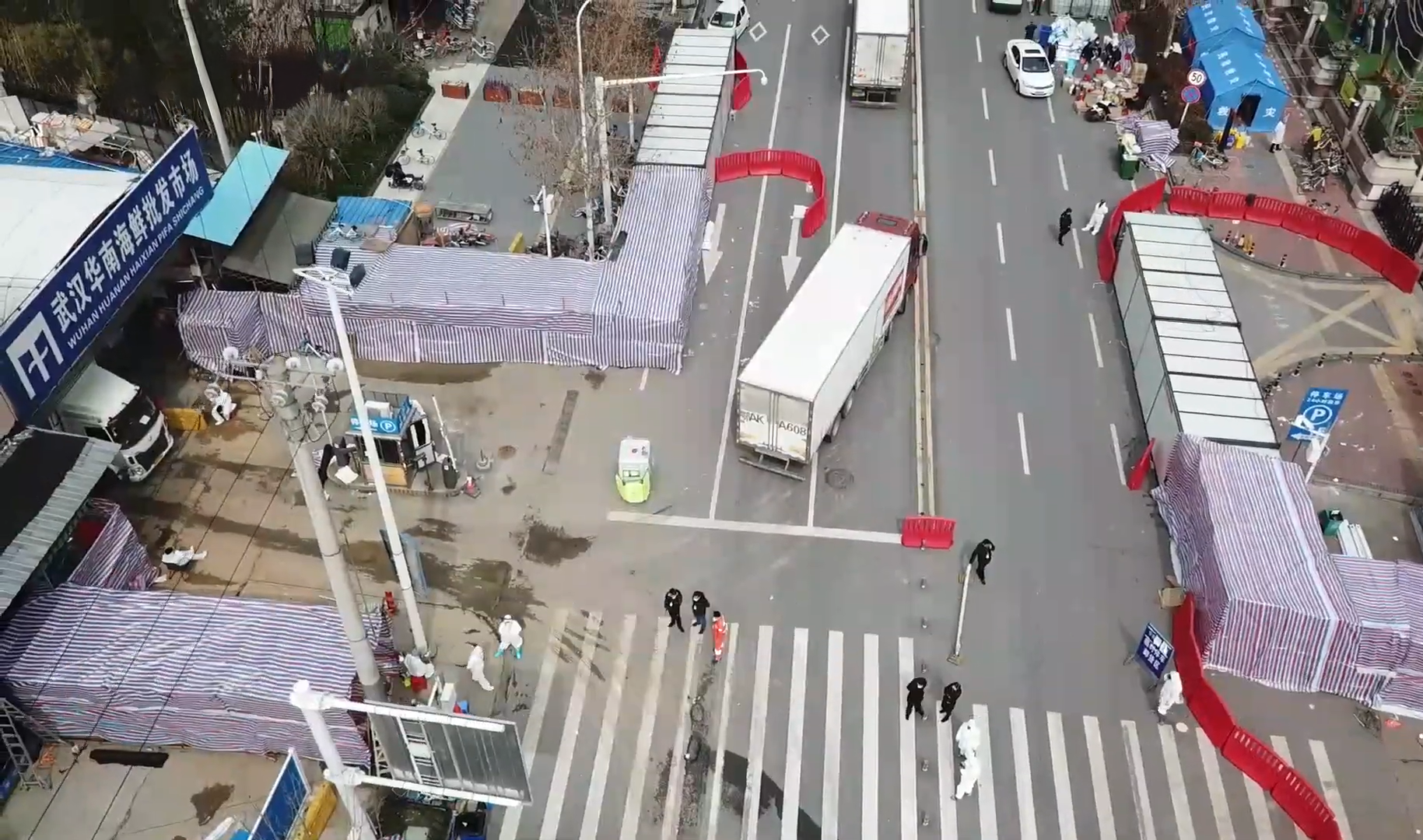
- Outside the market in March 2020, after its closure
- Location: 207 Fazhan (Development) Blvd, Jianghan District, Wuhan, Hubei, China; 30.6196°N 114.2576°E
- Opening date: 19 June 2002
- Closing date: 1 January 2020
- Owner: unknown
- Number of tenants: 1,000+ [before closing]
- Total retail floor area: 50,000 m^{2} (540,000 sq ft)
- Interactive map of Wuhan Huanan Seafood Wholesale Market 武汉华南海鲜批发市场

Huanan Seafood Wholesale Market
- Simplified Chinese: 武汉华南海鲜批发市场
- Traditional Chinese: 武漢華南海鮮批發市場
- Literal meaning: Wuhan South China Seafood Wholesale Market
Transcriptions
Standard Mandarin
- Hanyu Pinyin: Wǔhàn Huánán Hǎixiān Pīfā Shìchǎng

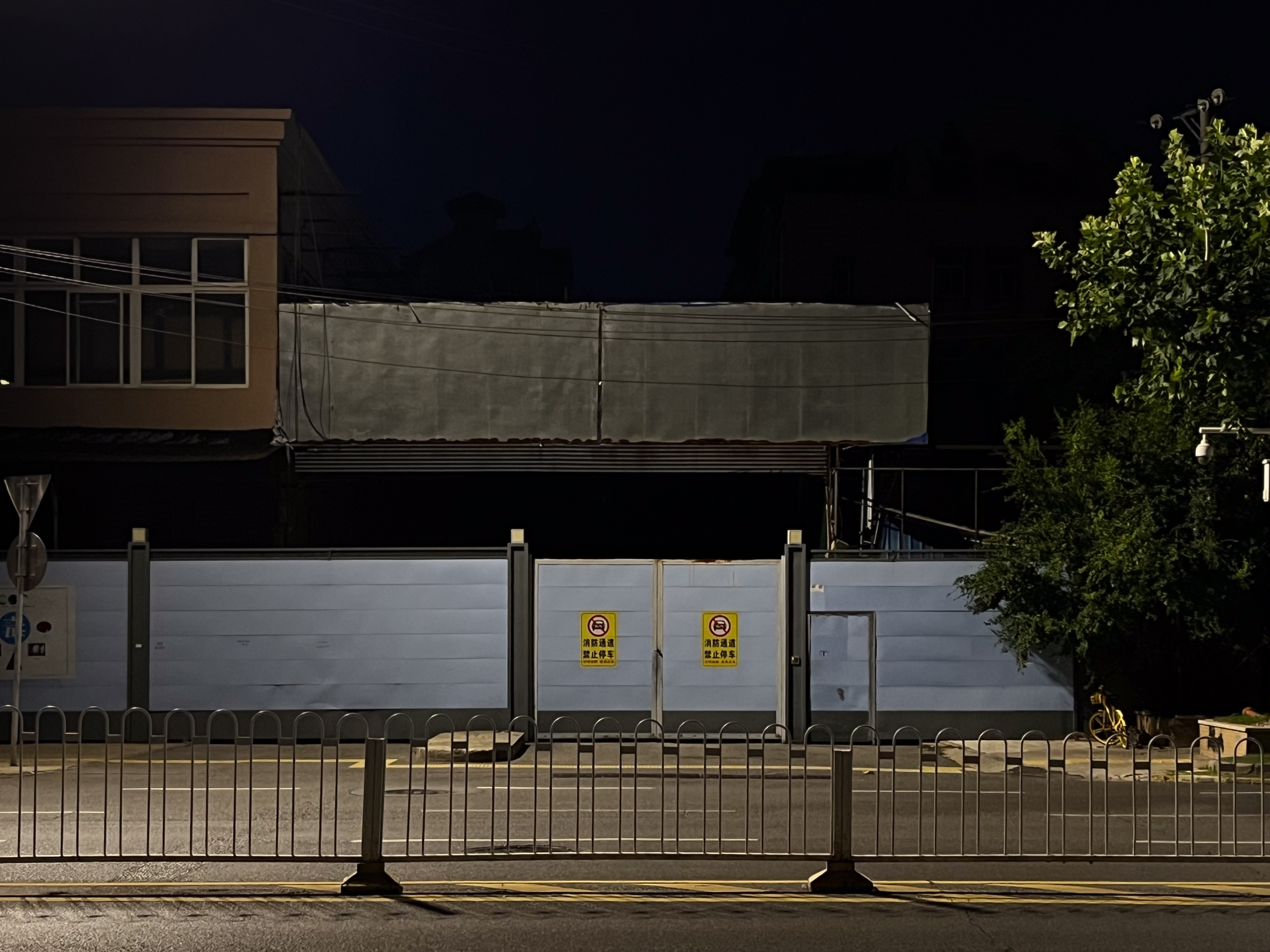
Entrance to the market in 2025

The Wuhan Huanan Seafood Wholesale Market (Chinese: 武汉华南海鲜批发市场), also known as the Huanan Seafood Market (Huanan means 'South China') was a seafood market in Jianghan District, Wuhan, the capital of Hubei Province, in Central China. The market opened on 19 June 2002.

The market became widely known worldwide after being identified by some sources as the epicenter site of SARS-CoV-2 (COVID-19) and the resulting pandemic. It is still one of the most likely points of origin for the disease. The World Health Organization (WHO) was notified on 31 December 2019 about an outbreak of pneumonia in Wuhan. Of the initial 41 people hospitalized with "pneumonia", who were officially identified as having laboratory-confirmed SARS-CoV-2 infection, by 2 January 2020, two-thirds were exposed to the market.

The market was closed permanently on 1 January 2020 for sanitary procedures and disinfection. Thirty-three out of 585 environmental samples (5.6%) obtained from the market indicated evidence of COVID-19 outbreak, according to the Chinese Center for Disease Control and Prevention.

With more than 1,000 stalls across roughly 50,000 square metres, it was the largest seafood wholesale market in central China and supplied the wider region. Its main goods were crab, shrimp and striped bass; wildlife was sold in a separate section.

== Facility and operations ==
The market occupied over 50,000 m^{2} (12 acres) and had over 1,000 tenants. It is reported to have been the largest seafood wholesale market in Central China, with wild animals sold in its western zone. The market was located in the newer part of the city, near shops and apartment blocks, about 800 meters (2,600 ft) from Hankou railway station.

In late 2019, the market passed city official inspections, according to The Wall Street Journal. However, Time reported it to have "unsanitary" conditions. It had narrow lanes and stalls in close proximity, where livestock were kept alongside dead animals. According to Business Insider, it was common to see animals openly slaughtered and carcasses skinned in the market. The New York Times reported that "sanitation was dismal, with poor ventilation and garbage piled on wet floors."

The Huanan seafood market was the ground floor of the building. Following its closure, it was sanitized in depth and did not reopen. On the second floor, there is Huanan Glasses Wholesale City (华南眼镜批发城), which closed only during the Wuhan lockdown and is still in operation.

== Items sold ==
With local demand present for the consumption of exotic animals, the market also offered exotic game (ye wei in Chinese) and other wild animals for sale, a feature uncommon in most Chinese markets. A price list posted by one vendor on the popular Chinese review site Dazhong Dianping listed 112 items, including a number of wild animals. The South China Morning Post reported on 29 January 2020, that the market had a section selling around "120 wildlife animals across 75 species."

It was incorrectly reported that koalas were sold at the market. The price list included "树熊" (pinyin: shùxióng; lit. 'tree bear'). This term is used for koalas in Chinese communities in Singapore, Malaysia, and Hong Kong, but in China, they are called "考拉" (read as "kǎolā"). At the Huanan market, 'tree bear' referred to large rodents.

According to a study published in Scientific Reports in June 2021, 38 wildlife species, including 31 protected species, were sold between May 2017 and November 2019 in Wuhan's markets (Huanan seafood market, Baishazhou market, Dijiao outdoor pet market, and Qiyimen live animal market) for food and as pets. These species included raccoon dogs, Amur hedgehogs, Siberian weasels, hog badgers, Asian badgers, Chinese hares, Pallas's squirrels, masked palm civets, Chinese bamboo rats, Malayan porcupines, coypus, marmots, red foxes, minks, red squirrels, wild boars, and complex-toothed flying squirrels. The wild animals on sale suffered poor welfare and hygiene conditions and were capable of hosting a wide range of infectious zoonotic diseases or disease-bearing parasites. No pangolin or bat species were among the animals for sale.

== Link to COVID-19 ==
=== Risks identified pre-pandemic ===
Even before the pandemic, the market was identified as a likely site for zoonosis (diseases hopping to humans from other species). There were over a thousand raccoon dogs for sale in the market, and about nine thousand other animals. Samples collected in the market in early 2020 showed high levels of SARS-CoV-2 and raccoon dog genetic material (often both in the same samples), especially from a stall ("Stall 29") that kept a cage of raccoon dogs on top of a cage containing poultry, optimum conditions for the virus to hop the species barrier.

The existence of such a stall has been contested by Chinese authorities; the stall had been photographed in 2014 by Edward C. Holmes, an Australian virologist who visited the market while working with local researchers, and while a guest professor with the Chinese Center for Disease Control and Prevention (CCDC) from 2014 to 2020; it had also been filmed by a local in December 2019 and posted on Weibo. Raccoon dogs are known to be able to catch and spread COVID-19 easily.

These samples were swabs of surfaces in the market. Samples from the actual animals in the market would be more conclusive but were not collected. The market was closed on 1 January, and the animals had been removed before public-health authorities from the Chinese CDC came in. Although the samples do not definitively prove that the raccoon dog is the "missing" intermediate animal host in the bat-to-human transmission chain, it does show that raccoon dogs were present in the Huanan market at the time of the initial SARS-CoV-2 outbreak, in areas that were also positive for SARS-CoV-2 RNA, and substantially strengthens this hypothesis as the proximal origin of the pandemic.

=== Early identification of potential pandemic link (2019–2020) ===
In December 2019, an epidemic of a pneumonia cluster occurred in Wuhan. By 2 January 2020, a new strain of coronavirus, later determined to be SARS-CoV-2, was confirmed in an initial 41 people hospitalized with the pneumonia, two-thirds of whom had direct exposure to the market. As coronaviruses (like SARS-CoV and MERS-CoV) mainly circulate among non-human animals, and with a link between the pneumonia outbreak and the market being established, it was suspected that the virus may have been passed from an animal to humans (zoonosis).

Bats were initially suggested to be the source of the virus, although it remains unclear if bats were sold there. Later studies hypothesized that pangolins may be the intermediate host of the virus originating from bats, analogous to the relationship between SARS-CoV and civets. Phylogenetic analysis indicates that pangolins are a potential reservoir host rather than the intermediate host of SARS-CoV-2. While there is scientific consensus that bats are the ultimate source of coronaviruses, SARS-CoV-2 originated from a pangolin, jumped back to bats, and then jumped to humans, according to phylogenetic analysis. Therefore, a specific population of bats is more likely to be the intermediate host for SARS-CoV-2 than a pangolin, while an evolutionary ancestor to bats was the source for general coronaviruses.

Despite the role that the market played in the pandemic, it is yet unclear whether the novel coronavirus outbreak started in the market. The earliest known symptomatic case was reported on 1 December 2019, in a person who did not have any exposure to the market or to the remaining affected 40 people. A paper from a large group of Chinese researchers from several institutions, published in The Lancet, offered details about the first 41 hospitalized patients who had confirmed infections with SARS-CoV-2. Their data showed 13 of the initial 41 people found with the novel coronavirus had no link with the market, a significant figure, according to infectious diseases specialist Daniel Lucey. In a later publication, The Lancet reported that of the first 99 people confirmed with COVID-19 in Wuhan Jinyintan Hospital between 1 and 20 January 2020, 49 had a history of exposure to the market. The publication nevertheless did not opinionate on whether the market was the origin or just a key link in the epidemic.

In an attempt to discover the origin of SARS-CoV-2, samples from the market's animals were also taken between 1 and 12 January 2020. In late January 2020, the Chinese Center for Disease Control and Prevention revealed that the virus was found in 33 out of 585 of environmental samples taken, 31 of which came from the area of the market where wildlife was particularly found. This was another indication of the role that the market played, but its identification as the origin of the epidemic has been disputed. A review published on 24 January 2020, noted that the market was not associated with any COVID-19 cases outside of China.

In May 2020, George Gao, the director of the Chinese Center for Disease Control and Prevention, said animal samples collected from the seafood market had tested negative for the virus, indicating that the market was the site of an early superspreading event, but it was not the site of the initial outbreak. On 11 December 2020, Reuters reported that the market was still empty and barricaded.

=== WHO investigation and later assessments (2021–2023) ===
On 31 January 2021, a team of scientists led by the World Health Organization visited the market to investigate the origins of COVID-19. The WHO investigation determined that despite cluster cases there in an early outbreak and some contaminated surfaces found, no infected animal was found, concluding that human to human transmission at the market was likely, with the origin site still unknown.

In late July 2022, two papers were published in the journal Science, both describing evidence that the pandemic likely began at the market, and probably did not originate at a laboratory. The Chinese government has long insisted that the virus originated outside China, and until June 2021, denied that live animals were traded at the Huanan market.

Some Chinese researchers had published a preprint analysis of these samples in February 2022, concluding that the coronavirus in the samples had likely been brought in by humans, not the animals on sale, but omissions in the analysis had raised questions, and the raw sample data had not yet been released. As academic journals often require that the raw data be published prior to review, academics had been expecting the publication of the raw data behind the preprint paper. No raw genetic data had previously been accessible to any academics not working at Chinese institutions until the genetic sequences from some of the market swabs were uploaded to an international database. Florence Débarre, a researcher at the French National Center for Scientific Research, stumbled across the samples on March 4, 2023, and brought them to the attention of others. An international team of researchers assembled to analyse the new data, but when they reached out to the Chinese researchers from the Chinese Center for Disease Control and Prevention who uploaded the data, there was no reply and the samples were removed from the public database by the uploaders. Analysis of the downloaded sequences was proceeding without Chinese collaboration, as of 16 March 2023.

On 14 March, the international group of researchers presented a preliminary analysis at a meeting of the World Health Organization's Scientific Advisory Group for Origins of Novel Pathogens, at which, several of the Chinese researchers were present. Shortly afterwards, changes in the status of the preprint suggested that it is now under review for print publication. The international research team welcomed the move and hoped the Chinese team's paper would be revised to include the full genetic data, saying they would also be publishing an analysis and hoped that, as scientists, they would work together on the issues.

The New York Times was not able to reach the Chinese scientists for comment by 16 March, but George Gao, the former head of the CCDC and lead author on the February 2022 preprint, told Science that there was "nothing new" in the raw data, and refused to answer questions about why his research team had removed it from the database. On 17 March, the WHO director-general said that the data should have been shared three years earlier, and called on China to be more transparent in its data-sharing. Maria Van Kerkhove, the WHO's COVID-19 technical lead, called for this data to be made public immediately.

== Responses ==
=== Closure ===
On 1 January 2020, in response to the initial outbreak of the pneumonia cluster, the health authorities closed the market to conduct investigations, clean, and disinfect the location.

=== Ban on wild animal trade ===
Chinese environmentalists, researchers, and state media have called for stricter regulation of exotic animal trade in markets. Several Chinese scientists have called for bans on wildlife trade since 2003.

On 22 January 2020, a ban on the sale of all wild animal products in Wuhan was announced. In May 2020, the city banned eating wild animals and limited hunting and breeding of wild animals.

On 24 February 2020, the Chinese government announced that the trade and consumption of wild animals would be banned throughout China, amidst mounting domestic criticism of the industry. However, the ban does not cover the consumption of wild animal products in traditional Chinese medicine, according to The New York Times.

== See also ==
- COVID-19 pandemic in Hubei
- Proximal Origin
- Markets in China
- Wuhan 2019 Military World Games
- Wuhan Institute of Virology
  - Bat coronavirus RaTG13
- Human uses of bats
  - Bat as food
