= Bat as food =

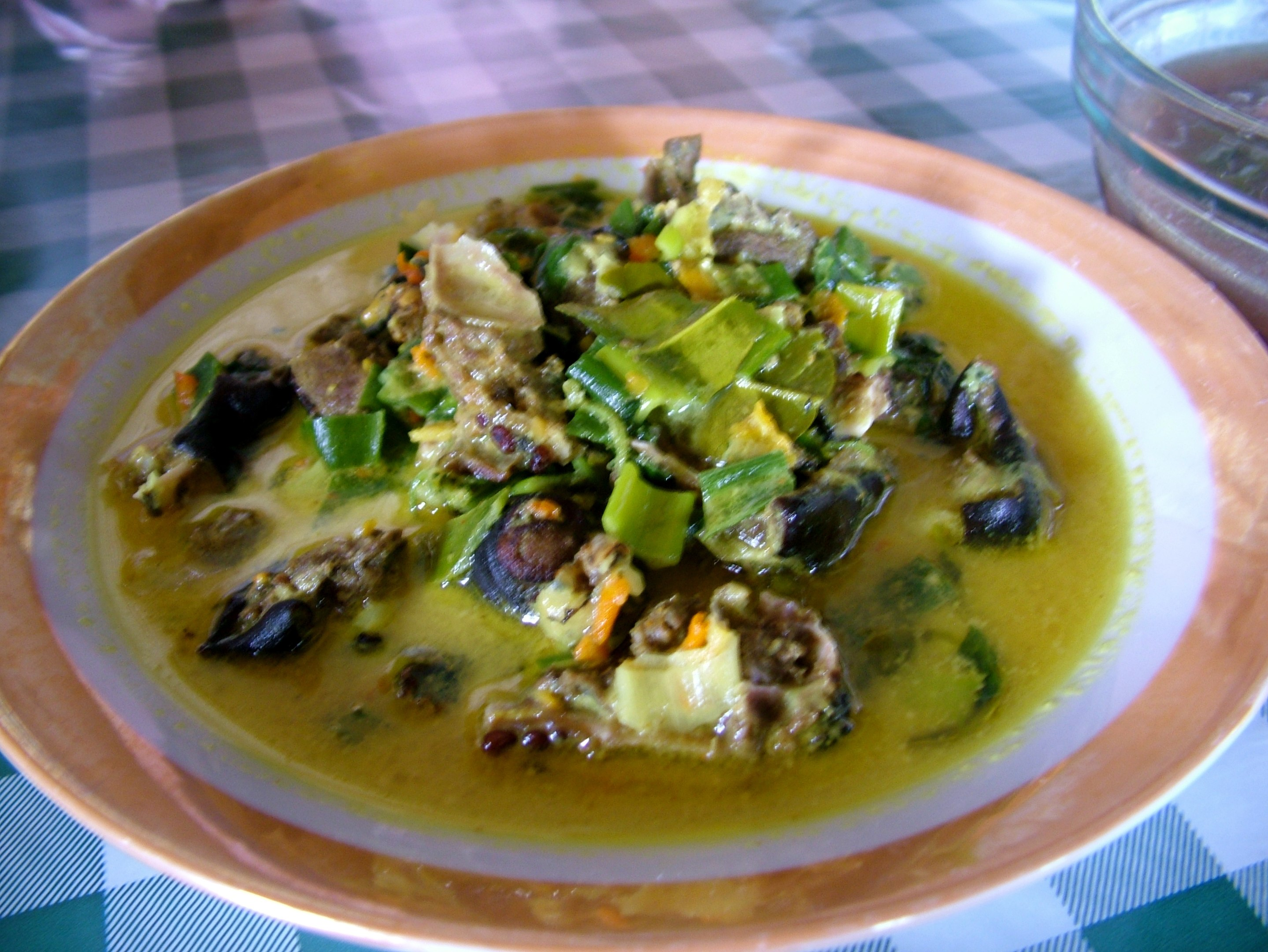
Paniki prepared with fruit bat meat cooked in spicy rica green chili pepper. A Minahasan dish. Manado, North Sulawesi, Indonesia.

Bats as food are eaten by people in some areas of Asia, Africa, Pacific Rim countries, and some other cultures, including China, Vietnam, the Seychelles, the Philippines, Indonesia, Palau, Thailand, and Guam. Half the megabat (fruit bat) species are hunted for food but only eight percent of the insectivorous bat species are. In Guam, Mariana fruit bats (Pteropus mariannus) are considered a delicacy.

== History ==
Bats have likely been consumed as a food source since prehistoric times in the Asia-Pacific region. Chronostratigraphic analysis of archaeological sites indicate that bats could have been exploited as a food source since 74,000 years ago by Homo floresiensis. On tropical islands, hunting large fruit bats was a worthwhile expenditure for prehistoric hominins. These megabats could be easily captured in caves in large numbers, and processing effort was also minimal.

Bats have been hunted by Aboriginal Australians for thousands of years, extending into modern times. Popular game species are the black flying fox and the little red flying fox. In 1997, it was estimated that the Aboriginal people of the Top End consumed 180,000 flying foxes each year.

While it has been suggested that the Taíno people of Puerto Rico consumed bat meat in pre-Columbian times, no bat bones have been documented in their midden heaps, making it unlikely that bat meat was a substantial dietary component. No other New World cultures are thought to have hunted bats for meat, though bat bones have been identified in midden heaps on the Caribbean island of Saba.

The consumption of bat meat in Europe has been scarce, not only because of repugnance, but also because of the size of European bats, which being all insectivores are also small. In the past it has been recorded the custom of the peasants of Costozza (in the province of Vicenza, Italy) to eat bats, especially horseshoe bats. After World War II the bats of Costozza's caves were almost extinct "for the ruthless hunting that the natives make of them, at the time of the grape, in order to assimilate them with the most tasty little birds." In 1959 it was reported that "in some places [of Italy], for example in Liguria and Veneto regions, the bats are or were used as food."

In the Torah and in the Bible, the book of Leviticus (11:13–19) forbids consumption of bat: "These you shall detest among the birds; they shall not be eaten, they are an abomination: (...) the bat."

In the Geographica of Strabo it is described the city of Borsippa (now Birs Nimrud in Iraq), where there was a large number of bats captured by the inhabitants, who "salad them to eat them". In the sixteenth century Italian naturalist Ulisse Aldrovandi refers in his treatise Ornitologia that bats have a white meat, edible, and excellent flavour.

== Modern prevalence ==
At least 167 species of bats are hunted around the world, or about 13% of all bat species, for reasons including food, perceived medical value, for hide or teeth, or for sport. Some species are hunted for food more often than others: Half of all megabat species are hunted for food, in comparison to only eight percent of insectivorous species. A 2016 review documented hunting of bats for meat or traditional medicine in North Africa, Sub-Saharan Africa, Oceania, South America, East Asia, Southeast Asia, and West and Central Asia. In contrast, it recorded no species hunted for meat or traditional medicine in the Caribbean, Europe, North America, Mesoamerica, or North Asia.

=== Africa ===
At least 55 species of bat are hunted in Africa, with larger bats as the preferred targets, while small, insectivorous species are considered less desirable. Bat hunting is most prevalent in West and Central Africa. It has been estimated that 100,000 bats are sold annually in Ghana. In Southern Africa and East Africa, there is little to no hunting. The four species of bats hunted in Northern Africa are used for traditional medicine purposes, not for meat.

Abundant and larger-bodied species are more frequently consumed in Africa, including the straw-coloured fruit bat, Franquet's epauletted fruit bat, the Gambian epauletted fruit bat, the hammer-headed bat, and Egyptian fruit bat. Medium-sized bats like the Angolan rousette and Peters's dwarf epauletted fruit bat are also consumed, as well as small species like the large slit-faced bat, horseshoe bats, and roundleaf bats.

=== Asia ===
Humans hunt 64 species of bats in Asia, though the intensity of hunting varies by region. In Southeast Asia, bats are widely hunted in ten of the eleven countries, excluding only Singapore. About 17% of bat species are hunted in Southeast Asia, or 56 species. The Philippines have especially high levels of hunting, with a third of bat species in the Philippines subject to hunting despite legal protections such as the Philippine Wildlife Act and Philippine Cave Management Act, which are poorly enforced. In the Philippines, especially Mayantoc, in the province of Tarlac, eating fruit bats as part of their regional cuisine is very common, locals went bat hunting and caught several dozens of bats in one trip, these cave creatures were skinned, beheaded, and de-winged; they were then gutted, chopped up, and stewed. In some Malaysian cities, bats are seen as a luxury meat. Back in 2001, it was reported that 7% of households in Thailand's Phu Kheio Wildlife Sanctuary ate bat meat. Consumption is particularly intense in North Sulawesi, where locals eat flying fox meat at least once a month, with a tenfold increase in frequency near Christian holidays.

In South Asia, hunting bats for food occurs in Bangladesh by tribal groups, specifically targeting larger bat species. A 2017 survey of over 140 villages in Bangladesh found that bats were hunted in 49% of villages, with the majority of hunters (62%) using hunted bats for food and medicine. In contrast, 30% of hunters used hunted bats for food, but not medicine, while 17% used them for medicine, but not food. While bats are killed in India and Pakistan, consumption is reported to be infrequent and perceived medicinal uses are more common motives. A few studies though state that bat meat consumption is more common in certain parts of India such as the Northeast, the Andaman and Nicobar Islands.

In East Asia, specifically southern China, bats are sometimes eaten and can be found in some markets. Specific bat species eaten in China include the cave nectar bat, Pomona roundleaf bat, Indian flying fox, and Leschenault's rousette. Additionally, the greater short-nosed fruit bat is hunted for medicine, but not food. Bat meat is not especially popular in China. It has been contested whether or not the Huanan Seafood Wholesale Market, suspected as having ties with the COVID-19 outbreak, sold bat meat, where the meat is reportedly not a frequent food source in the city of Wuhan. Some media outlets, including Daily Mail and RT, promoted a video that showed a young Chinese woman eating a bat and suggested it was shot in Wuhan, but later it was confirmed that the footage was filmed by travel vlogger Wang Mengyun in the island country of Palau in 2016, to showcase local cuisine. International agencies pressured China to adopt legislation forbidding the hunting of bats and sale of bat meat following the early 2000s SARS outbreak where hundreds of people died, though no such legislation was passed. All wildlife trade in China, including bat meat, was banned in January 2020 in response to the coronavirus pandemic which originated in Wuhan.

=== North America ===
Bats are not commonly eaten in the United States, although in 2012, a restaurant in Florida had served barbecued bat based on South American cuisine.

=== Oceania ===
Bats are regularly hunted and consumed in Oceania, and are the only native land mammals of many isolated islands. About 23% of Oceania's bat species are hunted, or 40 species. Bat meat is considered a delicacy in the Cook Islands, Niue, Guam, the Mariana Islands, and Samoa. It is popularly consumed in Fiji, New Caledonia, and Vanuatu.

=== South America ===
Though bat diversity in South America is especially high, bats are rarely consumed. Some indigenous peoples may consume bats, with the Nambiquara people known to consume three species of leaf-nosed bat. Live bats are sold in Bolivia for purported medicinal uses. Specifically, consuming the bats' blood is believed to treat epilepsy. A 2010 study documented that per month, 3,000 bats were sold in markets in four Bolivian cities. Species sold in these markets include Seba's short-tailed bats, mouse-eared bats and common vampire bats.

== Preparation and cooking ==
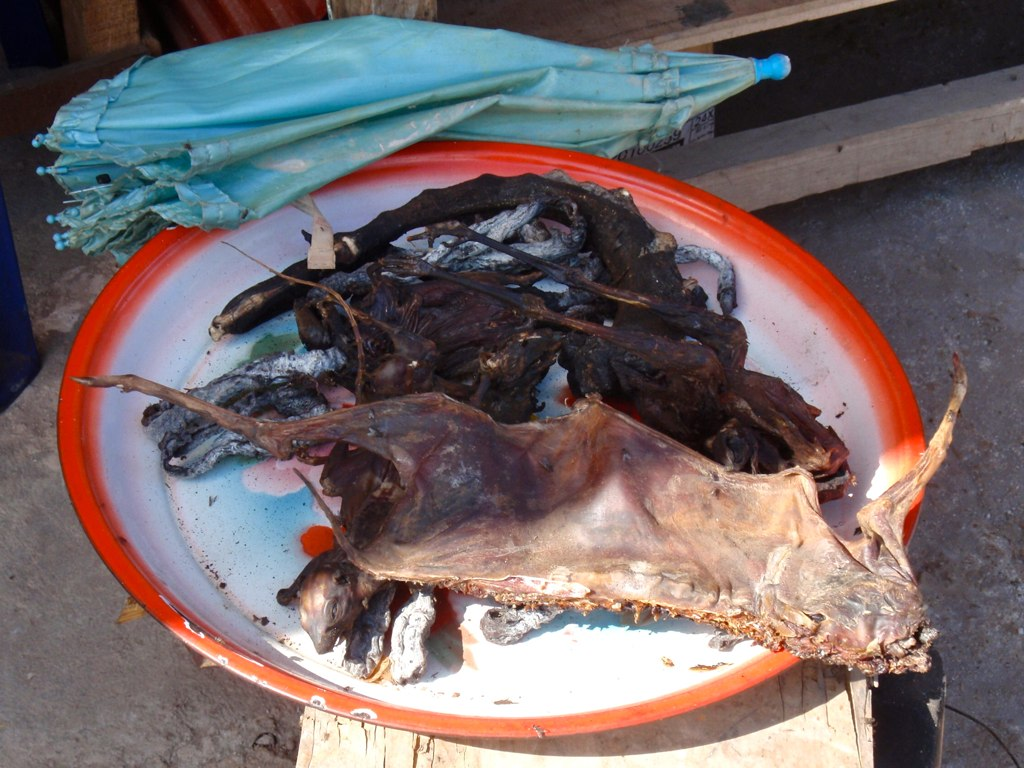
Barbecued bat

In the Philippines, especially Mayantoc, Tarlac, locals eat a dish called bat adobo. Locals catch and kill several dozen megabats per hunting trip; the bats are then skinned, beheaded, and de-winged before they are gutted, chopped, and stewed. Guava is used to tenderize the meat, which is later seasoned and sautéed with onions, garlic, and soy sauce—not much different from the usual Philippine adobo.

Paniki is a Minahasan dish from North Sulawesi, Indonesia, made from fruit bats. Soups, stews and curries using bat meat are also prepared.

In Palau, bat soup is considered a delicacy. Fruit bats are used in a Palauan soup that includes coconut milk, spices and ginger. Taiwan President Tsai Ing-wen was served bat soup during her state visit to the country in 2019.

Hot pot made with whole bat is available in some restaurants in southern China.

Bat stew is a stew prepared from various types of bats. Fruit bats are used in some versions of the dish. Estufa de morcego is a bat stew delicacy in the cuisine of São Tomé and Príncipe that is served on saints days and during fiestas.

The 1999 version of The Oxford Companion to Food states that the flavor of fruit bats is similar to that of chicken, and that they are "clean animals living exclusively on fruit". Bats are prepared in several manners, such as grilled, barbecued, deep fried, cooked in stews and in stir frys. When deep fried, the entire bat may be cooked and consumed.

Bat preparation

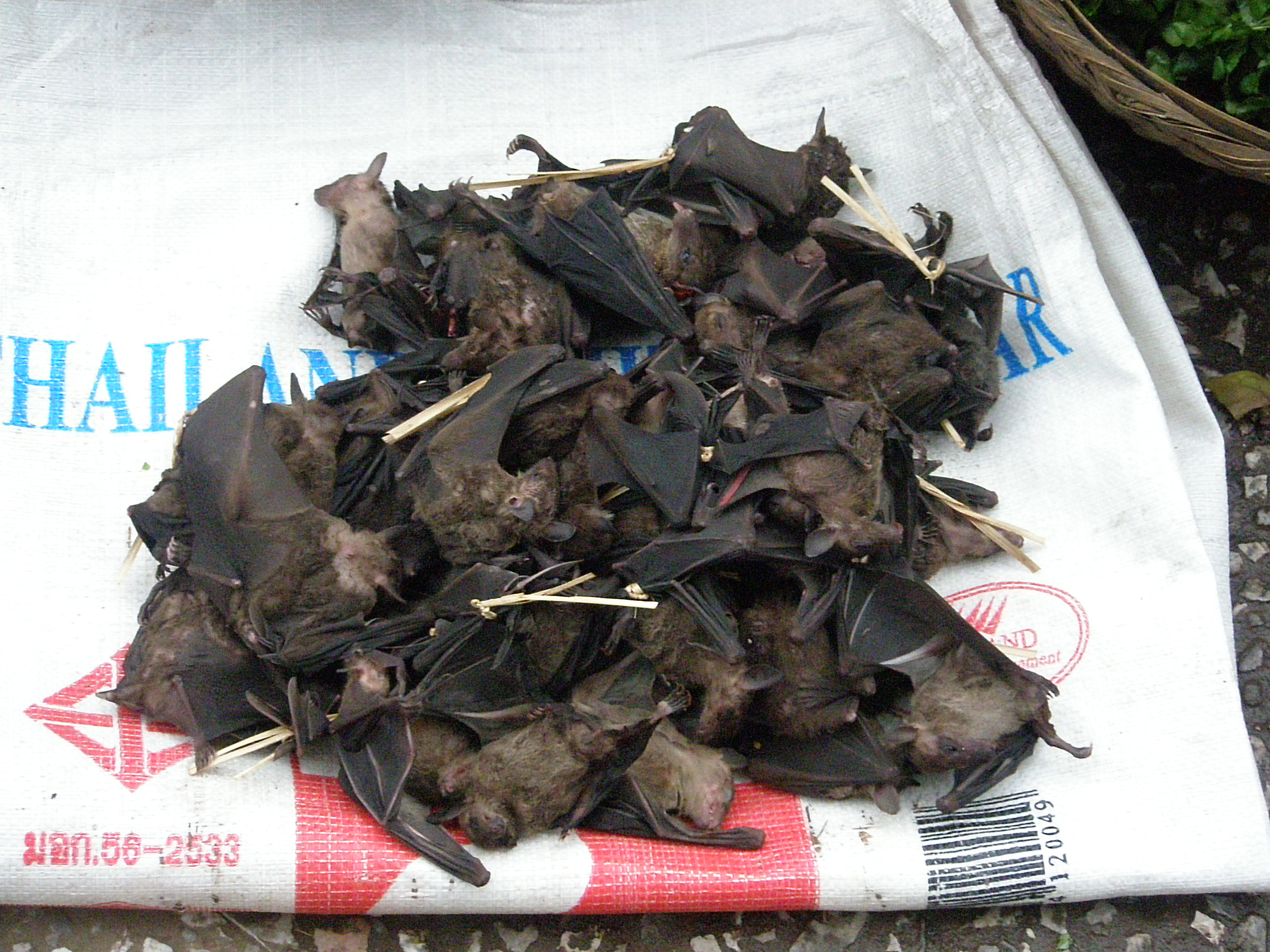
Bats for human consumption in Laos

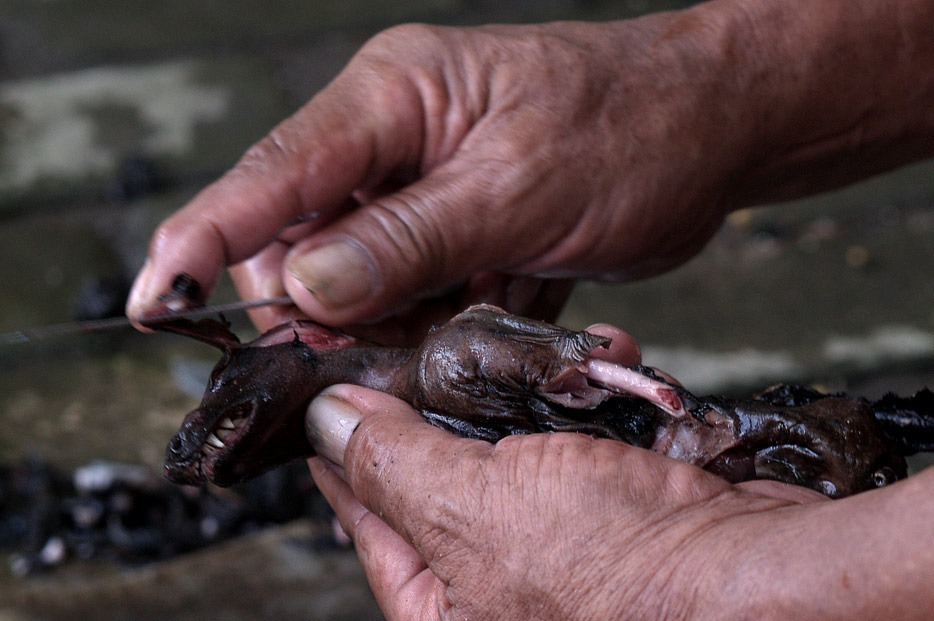
Preparation prior to cooking

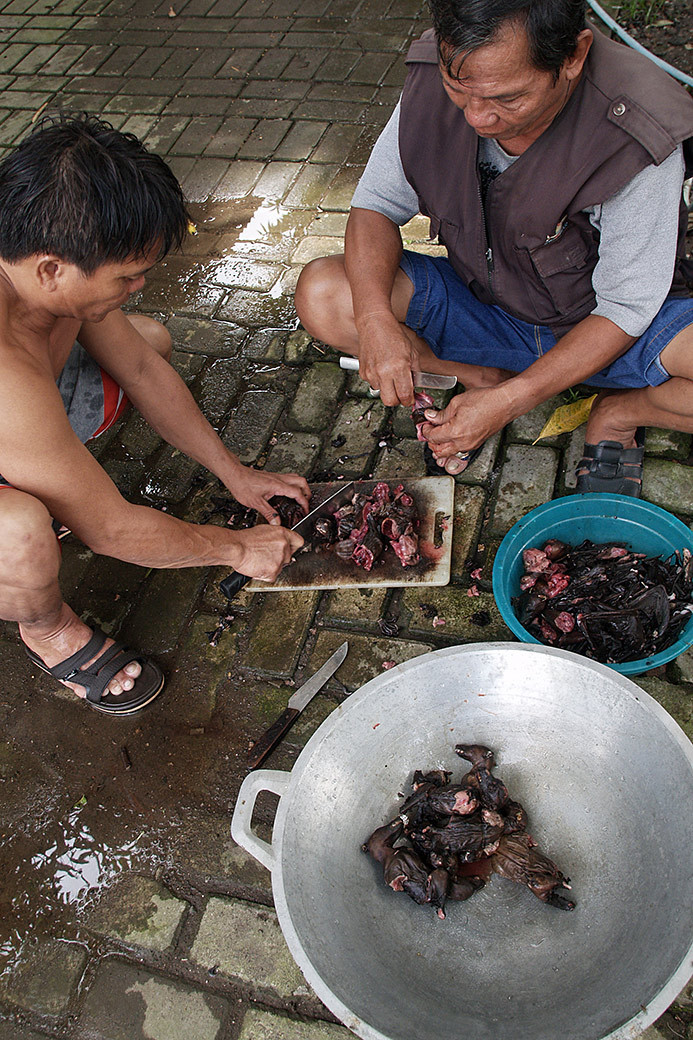
Another image of preparation

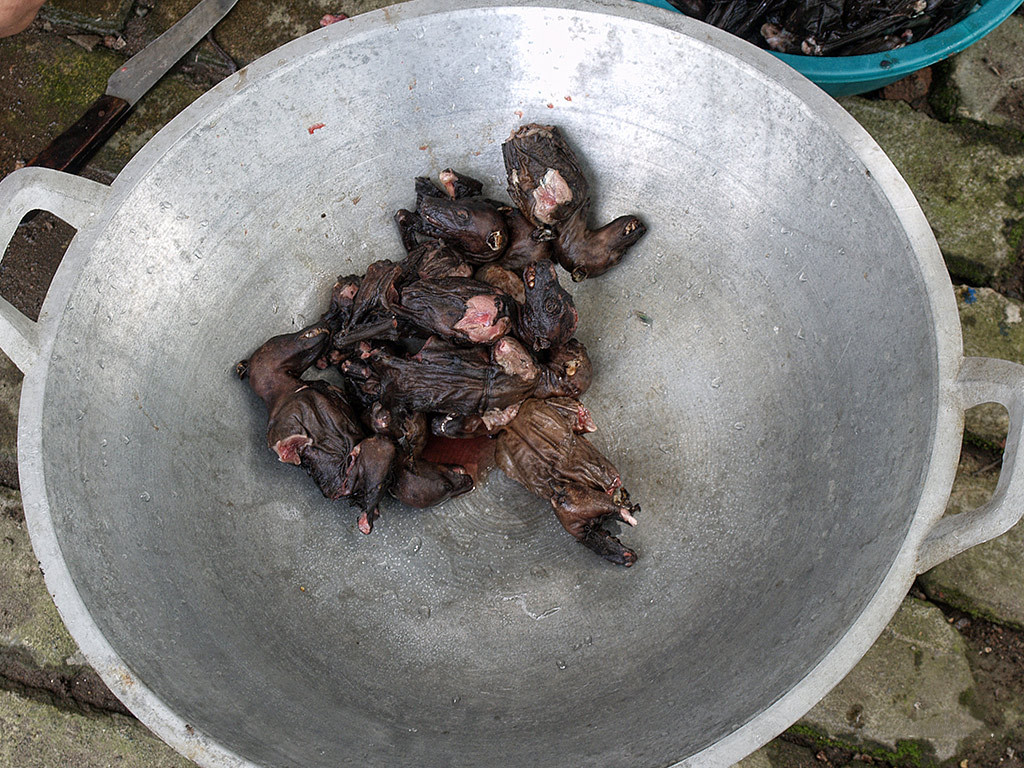
Ready for cooking

=== Nutrition ===
Detailed information of the nutritional and chemical composition of bat meat is not available as of 2012. In many developing countries, bushmeat, including bat meat, is considered a major nutritional resource, including for micronutrients. One study in Madagascar predicted that the rate of childhood anemia would increase 29% if access to bushmeat, including bat meat, was restricted, predominantly affecting the poorest households who could not afford to purchase meat from domestic animals.

== Issues ==
=== Overexploitation ===
Bats are most vulnerable to overhunting in Indonesia, the Philippines, Malaysia, and islands of Oceania and the Indian Ocean. Bats are susceptible to overhunting as they have naturally low rates of reproduction and many species are highly colonial, which makes it easier for them to be hunted in large numbers. Overhunting is believed to be the primary cause of extinction for the small Mauritian flying fox and the Guam flying fox.

=== Diseases ===
It has been speculated that megabats may be the natural reservoir of Ebolavirus, though the evidence has been called "far from decisive". Due to the possible association between Ebola infection and "hunting, butchering and processing meat from infected animals", several West African countries banned bushmeat (including megabats) or issued warnings about it during the 2013–2016 epidemic; many bans have since been lifted. Bats have been hypothesized as a possible origin of the severe acute respiratory syndrome coronavirus 2 (SARS-CoV-2), which was first detected in Wuhan, China, though the origin of the virus is not known.

=== Toxins ===
Eating fruit bats is also linked to a neurological disease called lytico-bodig disease. Paul Alan Cox from the Hawaiian National Tropical Botanical Garden in Kalaheo, and Oliver Sacks from Albert Einstein College in New York, found the bats consumed large quantities of cycad seeds and appear to accumulate the toxins to dangerous levels in their meat.

== See also ==
- Human uses of bats
