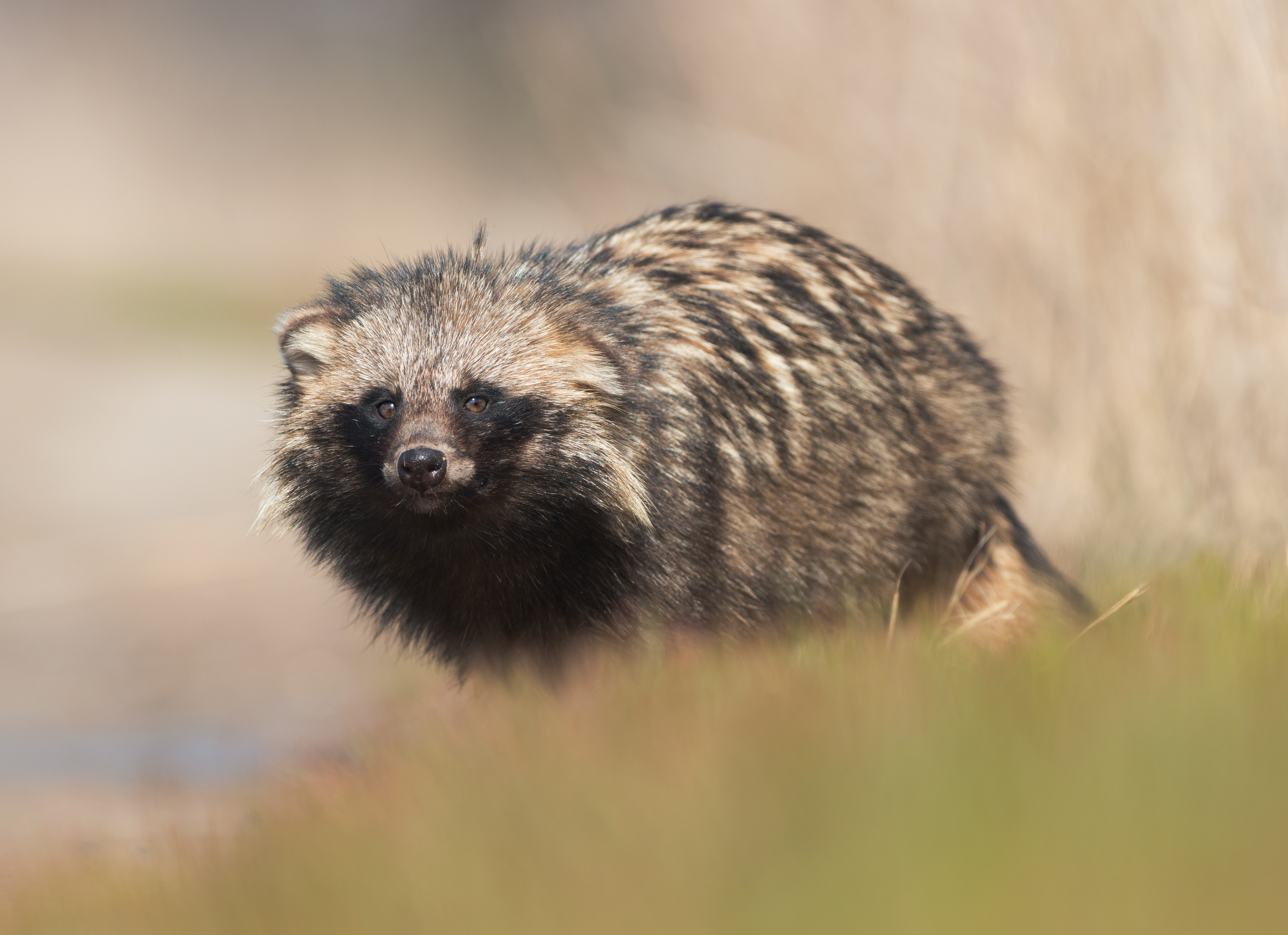
- Common raccoon dog in Ukraine

Conservation status
- Least Concern (IUCN 3.1)

Scientific classification
- Kingdom: Animalia
- Phylum: Chordata
- Class: Mammalia
- Order: Carnivora
- Family: Canidae
- Genus: Nyctereutes
- Species: N. procyonoides

Binomial name
- Nyctereutes procyonoides (Gray, 1834)
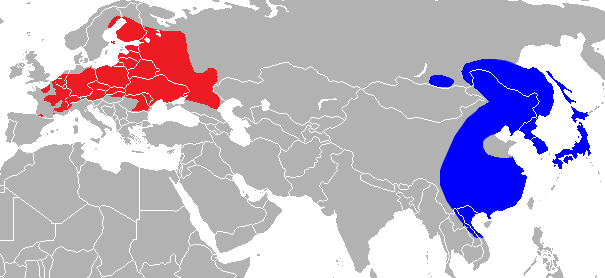
- Common raccoon dog range Blue – native area (including range of Japanese raccoon dog); Red – area of introduction

Synonyms
- Canis procyonoides Gray, 1834; Canis viverrinus Temminck, 1838; Nyctereutes albus Hornaday, 1904; Nyctereutes sinensis Brass, 1904; Nyctereutes amurensis Matschie, 1907; Nyctereutes stegmanni Matschie, 1907

= Common raccoon dog =

Canid indigenous to East Asia

The common raccoon dog (Nyctereutes procyonoides), also called the Chinese or Asian raccoon dog to distinguish it from the Japanese raccoon dog, is a heavy-set, fox-like canid native to East Asia. Named for its raccoon-like face markings, it is most closely related to foxes. Common raccoon dogs feed on many animals and plant matter, and are unusual among canids (dogs, foxes, and other members of the family Canidae) in that they hibernate during cold winters and can climb trees. They are widespread in their native range, and are invasive in Europe where they were introduced for the fur trade. The similar Japanese raccoon dog (Nyctereutes viverrinus, the tanuki), native to Japan, is the only other living member of the genus Nyctereutes.

The closest relatives of the common raccoon dogs are the true foxes, not the raccoon, which is one of the musteloids, and not closely related. Among the Canidae, the common raccoon dog shares the habit of regularly climbing trees only with the North American gray fox, which is neither a true fox nor a close relative of the common raccoon dog.

Due to the fur trade, the common raccoon dog has been widely introduced in Europe, where it has been treated as a potentially hazardous invasive species. In Scandinavia, it is called "marten-dog" (Swedish: mårdhund, Norwegian and Danish: mårhund). In Europe, since 2019, the common raccoon dog has been included on the list of Invasive Alien Species of Union concern (the Union list). This implies that this species cannot be imported, bred, transported, commercialized, or intentionally released into the environment in the whole of the European Union.

== Description ==
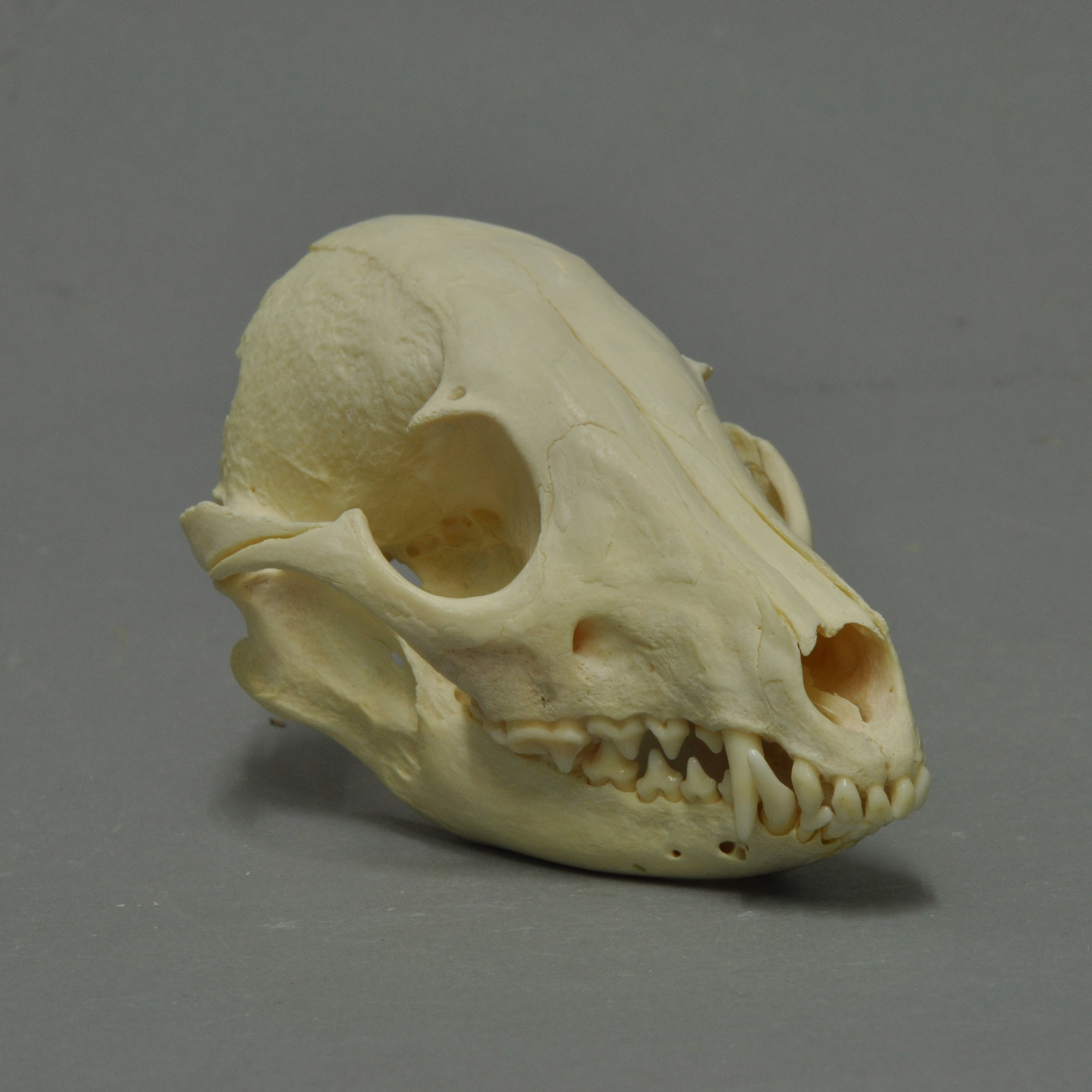
Raccoon dog skull.

Common raccoon dog skulls greatly resemble those of South American foxes, particularly crab-eating foxes, though genetic studies reveal they are not closely related. Their skulls are small, but sturdily built and moderately elongated, with narrow zygomatic arches. The projections of the skull are well-developed, with the sagittal crest being particularly prominent in old animals.

Reflecting their omnivorous diets, common raccoon dogs have small and weak canines and carnassials, flat molars, and relatively long intestines – (1.5–2.0 times longer than other canids). They have long torsos and short legs. Total lengths can range from 45 to 71 cm (18 to 28 in). The tail, at 12 to 18 cm (4.7 to 7.1 in) long, is short, amounting to less than a third of the animal's total length and hangs below the tarsal joints without touching the ground. The ears are short and protrude only slightly from the fur.

Weights fluctuate according to season: in March they weigh 3 kg (6.6 lb), while in August to early September males average 6.5–7 kg (14–15 lb), with some individuals attaining a maximal weight of 9–10 kg (20–22 lb). Specimens from Japanese and Russian studies have been shown to be on average larger than those from Chinese studies.

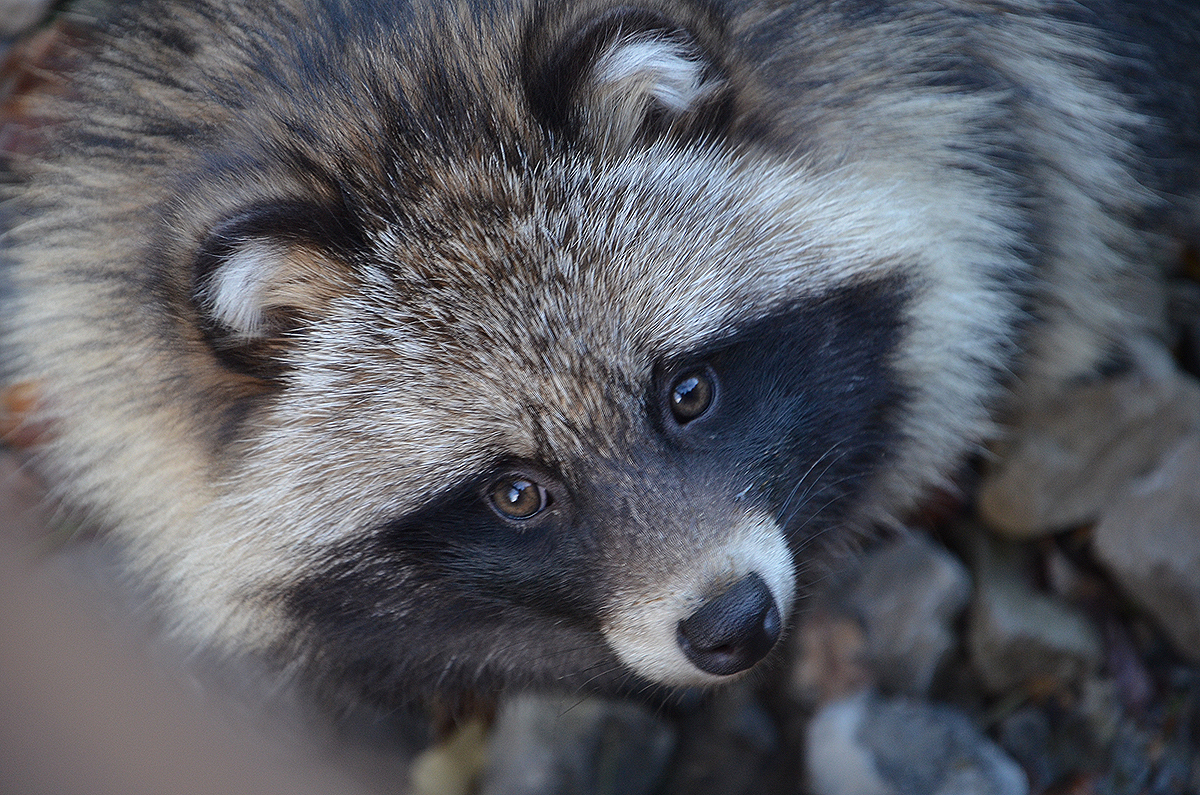
The distinctly raccoon-like markings of a raccoon dog's face.

The winter fur is long and thick with dense underfur and coarse guard hairs measuring 120 millimetres (4.7 in) in length. The winter fur protects common raccoon dogs from low temperatures ranging down to −20 to −25 °C (−4 to −13 °F). It is of a dirty, earth-brown, or brownish-grey colour with black guard hairs. The tail is darker than the torso. A dark stripe is present on the back, which broadens on the shoulders, forming a cross shape. The abdomen is yellowish-brown, while the chest is dark brown or blackish. The muzzle is covered in short hair, which increases in length and quantity behind the eyes. The cheeks are coated with long, whiskery hairs. The summer fur is brighter and reddish straw-coloured.

A rare white colour type occurs in China. They can also come in a yellow colour.

== Ecology ==
=== Diet ===
Common raccoon dogs are omnivores that feed on insects, rodents, amphibians, birds, fish, reptiles, mollusks, crabs, sea urchins, human garbage, carrion, and eggs, as well as fruits, nuts, and berries. Among the rodents targeted by common raccoon dogs, voles seem to predominate in swampy areas, but are replaced with gerbils in flatland areas such as Astrakhan. Frogs are the most commonly taken amphibians; in the Voronezh region, they frequently eat fire-bellied toads, while European spadefoot toads are usually taken in Ukraine. Common raccoon dogs are able to eat toads that have toxic skin secretions by producing copious amounts of saliva to dilute the toxins. They prey on waterfowl, passerines, and migrating birds. Grouse are commonly hunted in their introduced range, and many instances of pheasant predation are recorded in the Ussuri territory.

Common raccoon dogs eat beached fish and fish trapped in small water bodies. They rarely catch fish during the spawning season, but eat many during the spring thaw. In their southern range, they eat young tortoises and their eggs. Insectivorous mammals hunted by common raccoon dogs include shrews, hedgehogs, and, on rare occasions, moles and desmans. In the Ussuri territory, large moles are their primary source of food. Plant food is highly variable, and includes bulbs, rhizomes, oats, millets, maize, nuts, fruits, berries, grapes, melons, watermelons, pumpkins, and tomatoes.

Common raccoon dogs adapt their diets to the season; in late autumn and winter they feed mostly on rodents, carrion, and feces, while fruit, insects, and amphibians predominate in spring. In summer they eat fewer rodents, and mainly target nesting birds, fruits, grains, and vegetables.

=== Predators ===
Wolves are the main predators of common raccoon dogs, killing large numbers of them in spring and summer, though attacks have been reported in autumn, too. In Tatarstan, wolf predation can account for more than half of dog deaths, while in northwestern Russia, it can amount to almost two-thirds. Red foxes kill common raccoon dog pups, and have been known to bite adults to death.

Both foxes and European badgers compete with common raccoon dogs for food, and have been known to kill them if common raccoon dogs enter their burrows. Eurasian lynxes rarely attack them. Birds of prey known to take raccoon dogs include golden eagles, white-tailed eagles, goshawks, and eagle owls.

== Behaviour ==
=== Reproduction and development ===
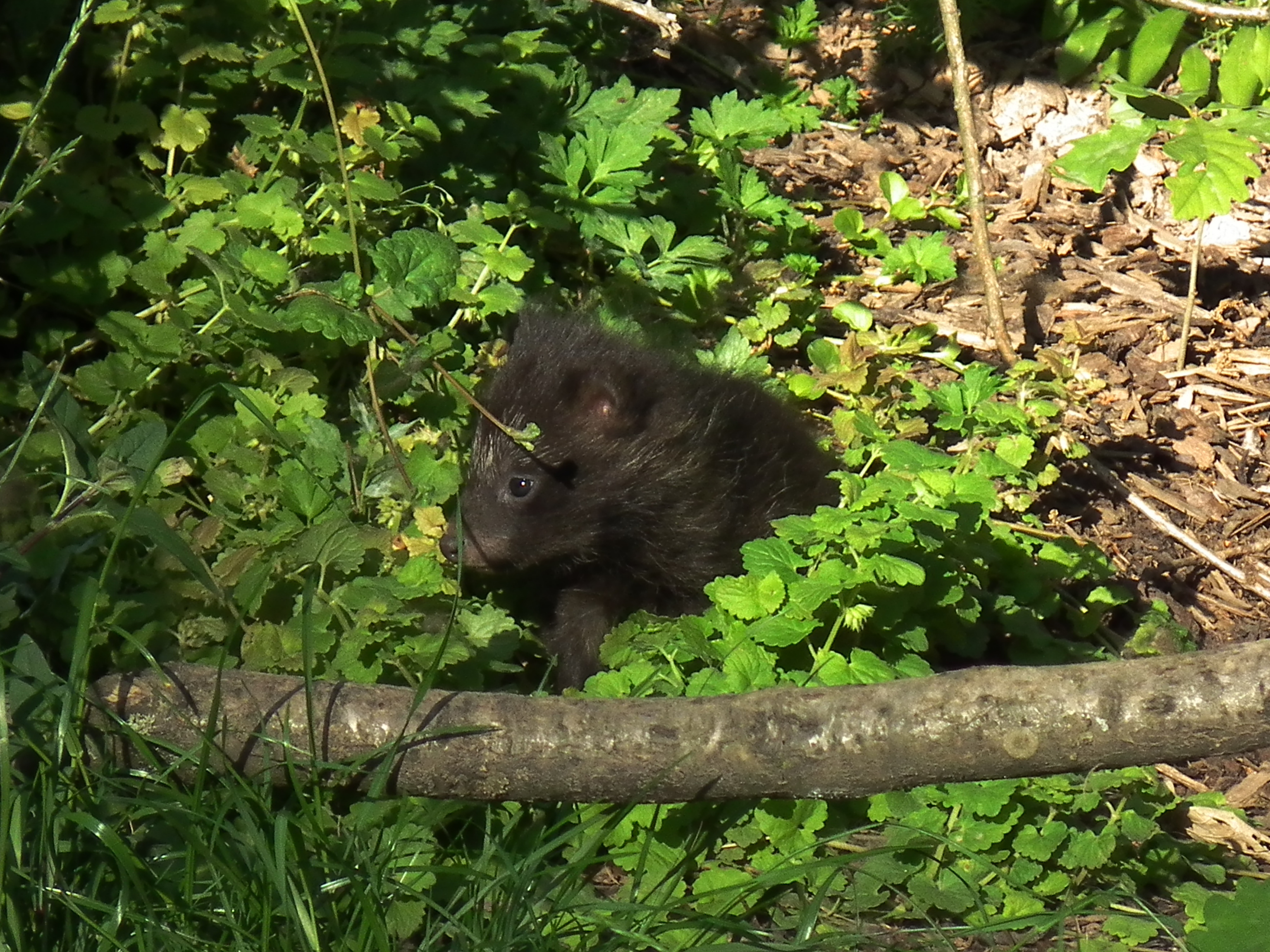
Raccoon dog pup.

The mating season begins from early February to late April, depending on location. Common raccoon dogs are monogamous animals, with pair formations usually occurring in autumn. Captive males, however, have been known to mate with four or five females. Males will fight briefly, but not fatally, for mates. Copulation occurs during the night, or at dawn, and typically will last 6–9 minutes. Estrus lasts from a few hours to six days, during which females may mate up to five times. Females enter estrus again after 20–24 days, even when pregnant.

The gestation period lasts 61–70 days, with pups being born in April–May. Litter sizes typically consist of 6–8 pups, though 15–16 pups can be born in exceptional cases. First-time mothers typically give birth to fewer pups than older ones. Males take an active role in raising the pups. This male role is very significant, as demonstrated by early releases in 1928 of pregnant females without males, resulting in very limited success at introduction, while later releases of pairs from 1929 until the 1960s resulted in the common raccoon dog's now-extensive introduced European range.

At birth, pups weigh 60–110 g (2.1–3.9 oz), and are blind and covered in short, dense, soft wool lacking guard hairs. Their eyes open after 9–10 days, with the teeth erupting after 14–16 days. Guard hairs begin to grow after 10 days, and first appear on the hips and shoulders. After two weeks, they lighten in colour, with black tones remaining only around the eyes. Lactation lasts for 45–60 days, though pups begin eating food brought to them as early as the age of three weeks to one month. They reach their full size at the age of 4.5 months. Pups leave their parents in late August–September. By October, the pups, which by then resemble adults, unite in pairs. Sexual maturity is reached at 8–10 months. Their longevity is largely unknown; animals 6–7 years of age have been encountered in the wild, while captive specimens have been known to live for 11 years.

=== Hibernation ===
Common raccoon dogs are the only canids known to hibernate. In early winter, they increase their subcutaneous fat by 18–23% and their internal fat by 3–5%. Animals failing to reach these fat levels usually do not survive the winter. During their hibernation, their metabolism decreases by 25%. In areas such as Primorsky Krai and their introduced range, common raccoon dogs hibernate only during severe snowstorms. In December, their physical activity decreases once snow depth reaches 15–20 cm (5.9–7.9 in), and limit the range from their burrows to no more than 150–200 m (490–660 ft). Their daily activities increase during February when the females become receptive, and when food is more available.

=== Vocalizations ===
Common raccoon dogs are usually silent, but males in rut may yelp and growl.

== Subspecies ==
As of 2005, four subspecies are recognised by MSW3:

| Subspecies | Trinomial authority | Description | Range | Synonyms |
|---|---|---|---|---|
| Chinese raccoon dog N. p. procyonoides Nominate subspecies | 1834, Gray | | Eastern China | kalininensis (Sorokin, 1958) sinensis (Brass, 1904) stegmanni (Matschie, 1907) |
| Korean raccoon dog N. p. koreensis | 1922, Mori | | Korean Peninsula | |
| Yunnan raccoon dog N. p. orestes | 1923, Thomas | | Southeastern China, northern Vietnam | |
| Ussuri raccoon dog N. p. ussuriensis | 1907, Matschie | Distinguished from N. p. procyonoides by its larger size and denser, longer hair. After being introduced to western USSR, it now occurs throughout Northern, Central and Eastern Europe. | Russia (Siberian Ussuri and Amur territories), northeastern China, North Korea; introduced to Europe | amurensis (Matschie, 1907) |

The Japanese raccoon dog was also considered a subspecies (N. p. viverrinus), but is currently thought to represent a distinct species.

== Expanded range and invasive species ==
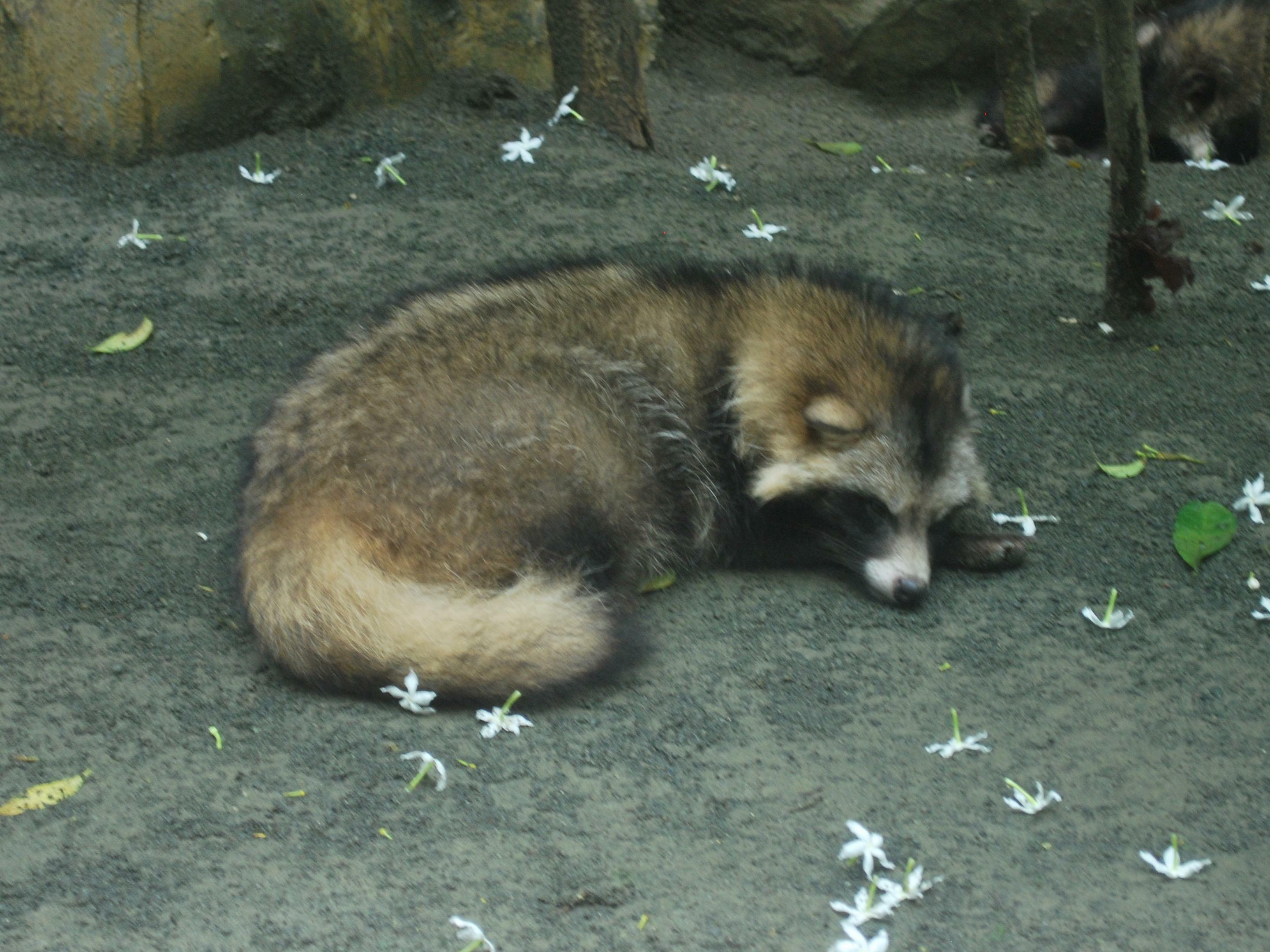
Raccoon dog sleeping.

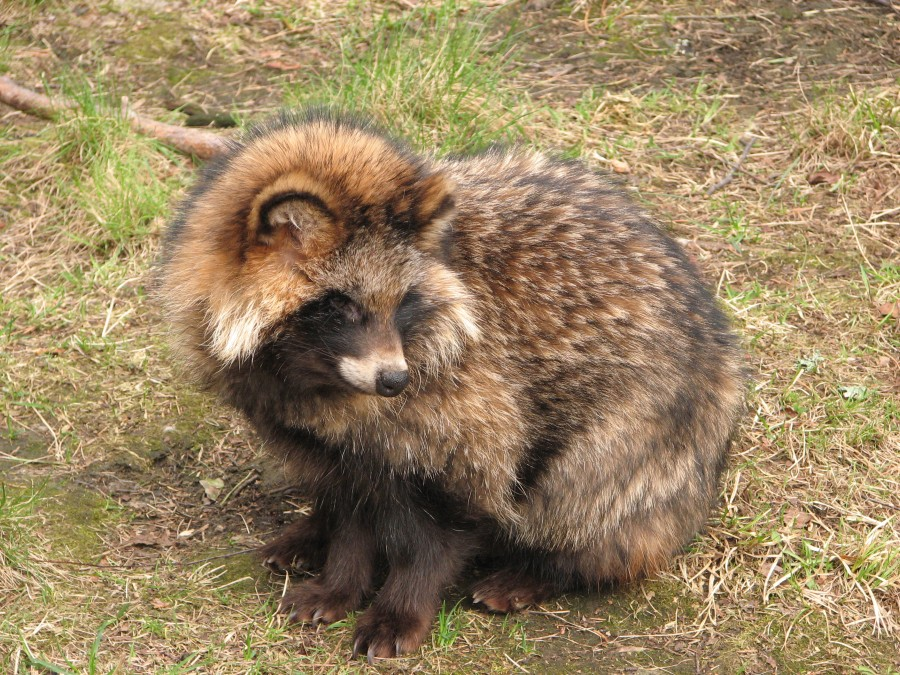
Raccoon dog in Finland

From 1928 to 1958, 10,000 raccoon dogs of the N. p. ussuriensis subspecies were introduced in 76 districts, territories, and republics of the Soviet Union in an attempt to improve their fur quality. Primorye in the Russian Far East was the first region to be colonised, with individuals being transplanted from islands in the Sea of Japan. By 1934, common raccoon dogs were introduced into Altai, the Northern Caucasus, Armenia, Kyrgyzstan (then known as Kirgizia), Tatarstan, Kalinin (now Tver Oblast), Penza, and Orenburg regions. In the following year, they were further introduced into Leningradsky District (Krasnodar Krai), Murmansk, Novosibirsk, and Bashkortostan.

Common raccoon dogs in Irkutsk, Novosibirsk, Trans-Baikaliya, and Altai did not fare well, due to harsh winters and scarce food. Common raccoon dogs also fared badly in the mountainous regions of the Caucasus, Central Asia, and Moldova. However, successful introductions occurred in the Baltic states, European Russia (particularly in then-Kalinin, now Tver Oblast; Novgorod, Pskov, and Smolensk regions), in central Russia (Moscow, Yaroslavl, Vologda, Gorkiy (now Nizhny Novgorod), Vladimir, Ryazan Oblasts, etc.) as well as in the Chernozem belt of Voronezh, Tambov, and Kursk; the lower Volga Region, and the level parts of Northern Caucasus and Dagestan. In Ukraine, the greatest numbers of raccoon dogs were established in Poltava, Kherson, and Luhansk.

In 1948, 35 common raccoon dogs were introduced into Latvia. The population increased rapidly. In 1960, Latvia officially reported a total of 4,210 common raccoon dogs were hunted.

The common raccoon dog is now abundant throughout Finland, Estonia, Latvia, and Lithuania, and has been reported as far away as Denmark, Norway, and Sweden, Belarus, Poland, Germany, Netherlands, Belgium, Luxembourg, France, Switzerland, Czech Republic, Hungary, Romania, Bulgaria, Serbia, and Moldova.

In response, Denmark set a goal of zero breeding for common raccoon dogs by 2015. However, by 2018, it had become fully established in Jutland (the mainland of Denmark, directly connected to Germany), with further projects mainly aimed at limiting or preventing its spread on the Danish islands.

In June 2021, a study commissioned by the United Kingdom's Department for Environment, Food and Rural Affairs identified the common raccoon dog as one of 20 invasive species likely to spread to the UK.

== Diseases and parasites ==
=== Coronaviruses ===
A virus similar to SARS-CoV was isolated from Himalayan palm civets (Paguma larvata), a common raccoon dog, and humans working in a live-animal market in Guangdong, China in May 2003.

Common raccoon dogs, as well as Himalayan palm civets, were originally believed to be the natural reservoirs of severe acute respiratory syndrome–related coronavirus (SARS). However, genetic analysis has since convinced most experts that bats are the natural hosts. Raccoon dogs were most likely only transient accidental hosts.

According to German virologist Christian Drosten, the common raccoon dog is the most likely intermediate host for transmission of SARS-CoV-1 and SARS-CoV-2 to humans, as common raccoon dogs are bred in China in fur farming.

An early locus of COVID-19 transmission was the Huanan live animal market, and even before the pandemic, the place was identified as a likely site for zoonosis (diseases hopping to humans from other species). There were over a thousand common raccoon dogs for sale in the market, and about nine thousand other animals. Samples collected in the market in early 2020 showed high levels of SARS-CoV-2 and common raccoon dog genetic material (often both in the same samples), especially from a stall ("Stall 29") that kept a cage of raccoon-dogs on top of a cage containing poultry, optimum conditions for the virus to hop the species barrier. The existence of such a stall has been contested by Chinese authorities; the stall had been photographed in 2014 by Edward C. Holmes, an Australian virologist who visited the market while working with local researchers, and while a guest professor with the Chinese Center for Disease Control and Prevention (CCDC) from 2014 to 2020; it had also been filmed by a local in December 2019 and posted on Weibo. Common raccoon dogs are known to be able to catch and spread COVID-19 easily.

These samples were swabs of surfaces in the market; samples from the actual animals in the market would be more conclusive but were not collected. The market was closed on 1 January 2020, and the animals were removed before public-health authorities from the Chinese Chinese Center for Disease Control and Prevention arrived at the site. Although the samples do not definitively prove that the raccoon dog is the "missing" intermediate animal host in the bat-to-human transmission chain, it does show that common raccoon dogs were present in the Huanan market at the time of the initial SARS-CoV-2 outbreak, in areas that were also positive for SARS-CoV-2 RNA, and substantially strengthens this hypothesis as the proximal origin of the pandemic.

Some Chinese researchers had published a preprint analysis of these samples in February 2022, concluding that the coronavirus in the samples had likely been brought in by humans, not the animals on sale, but omissions in the analysis had raised questions, and the raw sample data had not yet been released. As academic journals often require that the raw data be published prior to review, academics had been expecting the publication of the raw data behind the preprint paper. No raw genetic data had previously been accessible to any academics not working at Chinese institutions until the genetic sequences from some of the market swabs were uploaded to an international database. Florence Débarre, a researcher at the French National Center for Scientific Research, stumbled across the samples on March 4, 2023, and brought them to the attention of others. An international team of researchers assembled to analyze the new data, but when they reached out to the Chinese researchers from the Chinese Center for Disease Control and Prevention who uploaded the data, not only did they not get a reply, but also the samples were removed from the public database by the uploaders. Analysis of the downloaded sequences is proceeding without Chinese collaboration, as of March 16, 2023.

On March 14, 2022, the international group of researchers presented a preliminary analysis at a meeting of the World Health Organization's Scientific Advisory Group for Origins of Novel Pathogens, at which several of the Chinese researchers were present. Shortly afterwards, changes in the status of the preprint suggested that it was under review for print publication. The international research team welcomed the move and hoped the Chinese team's paper would be revised to include the full genetic data, saying they would also be publishing an analysis and hoped that, as scientists, they would work together on the issues.

The New York Times was not able to reach the Chinese scientists for comment by March 16, 2022, but George Gao, the former head of the CCDC and lead author on the February 2022 preprint, told Science that the raw data had "nothing new", and he refused to answer questions about why his research team had removed it from the database.

On 17 March 2022, the WHO director-general said that the data should have been shared three years earlier, and called on China to be more transparent in its data-sharing. Further data from further samples has not yet been made public, and Maria Van Kerkhove, the WHO's COVID-19 technical lead, called for it to be made public immediately.

The Chinese government has long insisted that the virus originated outside China, and until June 2021 denied that live animals were traded at the Huanan market.

=== Other viruses ===
The introduction of the common raccoon dog to Europe is thought to have brought with it infected ticks that introduced the Asian tick-borne meningoencephalitis virus.

Cases of common raccoon dogs carrying rabies are known from the lower Volga, Voronezh, and Lithuania.

Canine distemper occurs in common raccoon dogs inhabiting the northern Caucasus.

=== Bacteria ===
Captive common raccoon dogs in Soviet state animal farms were recorded to carry paratyphoid, anthrax, and tuberculosis.

=== Eukaryotes ===
==== Apicomplexa ====
Massive epizootics of piroplasmosis were recorded in Ukraine and Tartary.

==== Worms ====
Raccoon dogs carry 32 different parasitic worms, including eight trematode species, 17 species of nematodes, seven cestodes, and particularly Echinococcus.

==== Arthropods ====
Ticks include Dermacentor pictus, Ixodes ricinus, I. persulcatus, I. crenulatus, and Acarus siro.

Six species of fleas are known to be carried by them, including Chaetopsylla trichosa, C. globiceps, Paraceras melis, Ctenocephalides felis, C. canis and Pulex irritans.

Although they can be infected with mange, it does not pose a significant threat to their populations as it does with foxes.

== Relationships with humans ==
=== Game and crop damage ===
Common raccoon dogs are harmful to game bird populations, particularly in floodplains and the shorelines of estuaries, where they feed almost exclusively on eggs and chicks during the spring period. Birds amount to 15–20% of their diets in Lithuania, 46% on the Oka River floodlands, and 48.6% in the Voronezh Reserve. They are also harmful to the muskrat trade, destroying their nests and eating their young. In Ukraine, common raccoon dogs are harmful to kitchen gardens, melon cultivations, vineyards, and corn seedlings.

=== Hunting ===
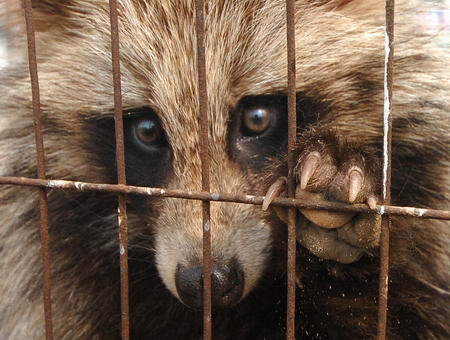
A caged raccoon dog.

Common raccoon dogs are typically hunted from November until the snow deepens. In the Far East, they are hunted at night using Laikas and mongrels. In the 19th century, the Goldi and Oroch people fastened bells to the collars of their common raccoon dog hounds. In their introduced range, common raccoon dogs are usually caught incidentally during hunts for other species. Hunting with dogs is the most efficient method in common raccoon dog hunts, having success rates of 80–90%, as opposed to 8–10% with guns and 5–7% with traps. Unless they retreat in their burrows, hunted common raccoon dogs can be quickly strangled by hunting dogs. Traps are usually set at their burrows, along the shores of water bodies, and around marshes and ponds.

In Finland, 60,000–70,000 common raccoon dogs were hunted in 2000, increasing to 170,000 in 2009 and 164,000 in 2010. Hunting of common raccoon dogs in Hungary began in 1997, with an annual catch of one to nine animals. In Poland, 6,200 were shot in 2002–2003. Annual Swedish and Danish common raccoon dog hunts usually result in the capture of two to seven individuals. Between 18,000 and 70,000 Japanese raccoon dogs were killed in Japan from the post-WWII period to 1982. Japan intensified its common raccoon dog culling starting in the 1970s, averaging 4,529 kills annually between 1990 and 1998. The numbers killed have since decreased.

=== Fur use ===
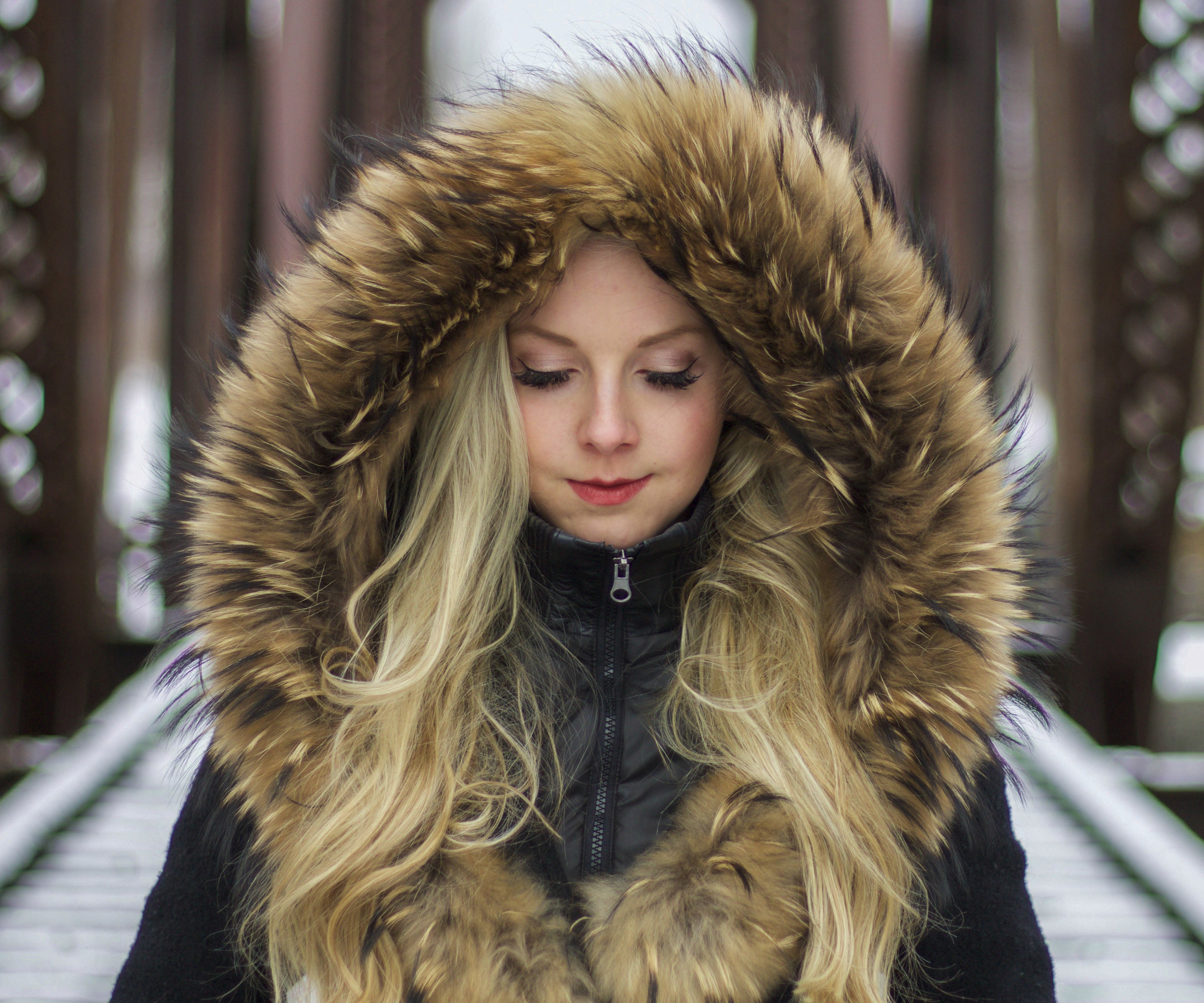
Jacket with raccoon dog fur trimming.

When used on clothing, the fur of the common raccoon dog is often called "murmansky" or "tanuki" fur. In the United States, it is marketed as "Asiatic raccoon", and in Northern Europe as "Finn raccoon". Generally, the quality of the pelt is based on the silkiness of the fur, as its physical appeal depends upon the guard hairs being erect, which is only possible in silkier furs. Small common raccoon dog pelts with silky fur command higher prices than large, coarse-furred ones. Due to their long and coarse guard hairs and their woolly fur fibre, which has a tendency to felt or mat, common raccoon dog pelts are used almost exclusively for fur trimmings. Japanese raccoon dog pelts, though smaller than other geographic variants, are the most valued variety, with specimens from Amur and Heilongjiang coming close behind, while Korean and southern Chinese are the least valued. When raised in captivity, common raccoon dogs can produce 100 g (3.5 oz) of wool of slightly lesser quality than that of goats.

Russian trade in common raccoon dogs was quite developed in the Primorye and Ussuri areas in the 1880s. The world trade of common raccoon dog pelts during 1907–1910 amounted to 260,000–300,000, of which an estimated 20,000 (5–8%) came from Russia, though more recent figures estimate a lesser number of 5,000–6,000; 12,000 common raccoon dogs were caught in the 1930s. In their introduced range, licensed trade of common raccoon dogs began in 1948–1950, with restrictions being removed in 1953–1955.

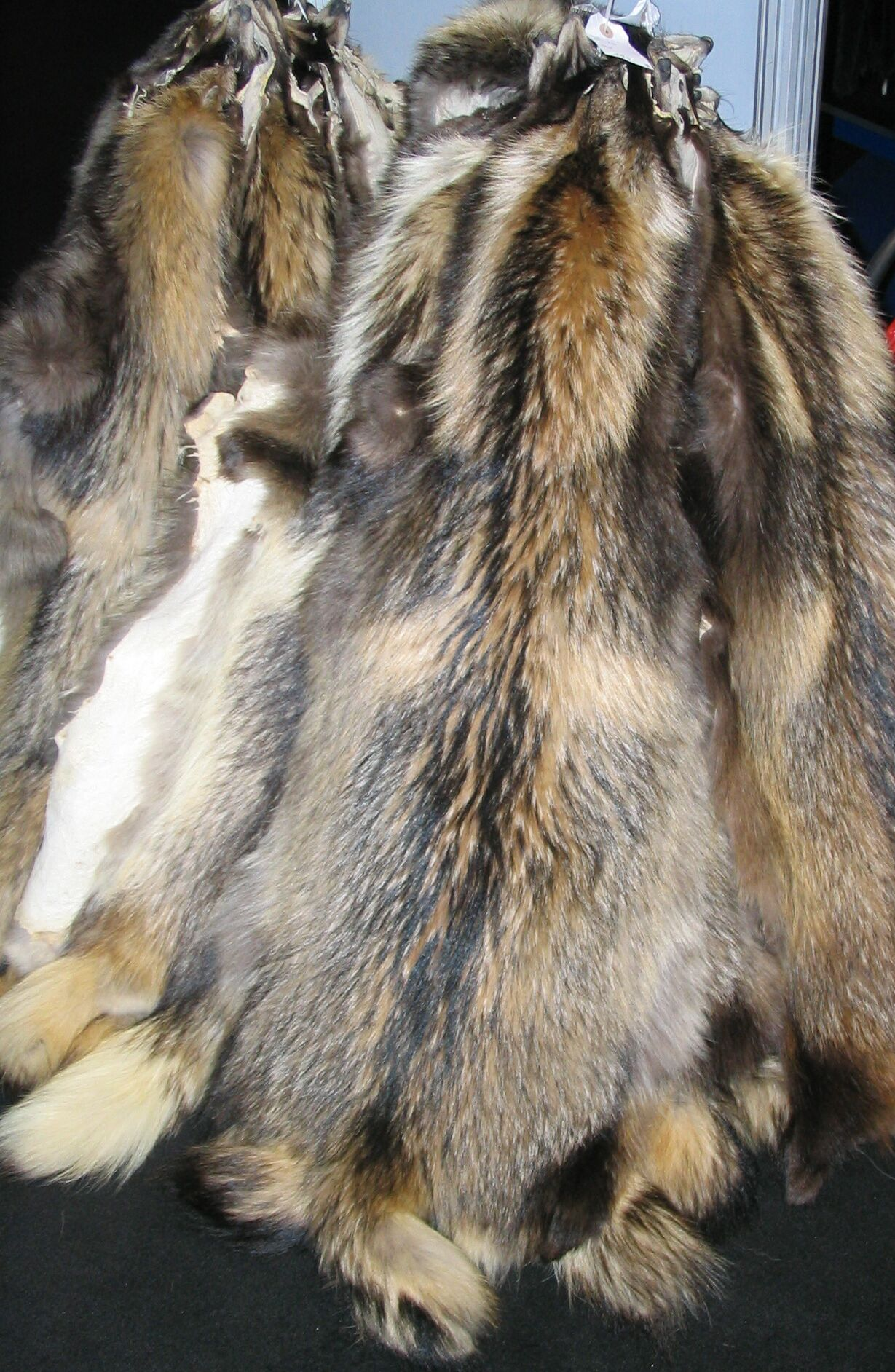
Chinese raccoon dog pelts on sale in Milan, Italy.

After the trade began, the number of catches increased sharply; from 1953 to 1961, it fluctuated between 30,000 and 70,000. In the latter year, about 10,000 were taken from their natural range in the Far East, while 56,000 were taken in their introduced range. Of the 56,000, 6,500 came from Belarus, 5,000 in Ukraine, 4,000 each for Latvia, Lithuania, and Krasnodar, 3,700 in Kalinin, 2,700 in Pskov, and 2,300 in Astrakhan, while 1,000–2,000 pelts each were produced in Vologod, Moscow, Leningrad, Novogrod, Smolensk, Yaroslavl, Azerbaijan, Estonia, and Dagestan. Fewer than 1,000 pelts were produced in all remaining republics and districts. Successful common raccoon dog introductions in Kalinin resulted in animals with denser and softer fur: The length of guard and top hairs increased by 7.96%, that of the underfur increased by 5.3%. The thickness of the guard and top hairs decreased by 3.41%. The density of the fur increased by 11.3%. They also became darker in colour, with black-brown pelts occurring in 8% of specimens, as opposed to 3% in their homeland.

Captive breeding of common raccoon dogs was initiated in 1928 in the Far East, with 15 state farms keeping them in 1934. Common raccoon dogs were the principal furbearers farmed during the early years of collective farms, particularly in Ukraine. By the 1940s, this practice lessened in popularity, as the common raccoon dogs required almost the same types of food as silver foxes, which were more valuable. An investigation by three animal protection groups into the Chinese fur trade in 2004 and part of 2005 asserts approximately 1.5 million common raccoon dogs are raised for fur in China. The common raccoon dog comprises 11% of all animals hunted in Japan. Twenty percent of domestically produced fur in Russia is from the common raccoon dog.

==== Misrepresentation as artificial fur ====
In several widely publicized incidents, clothing advertised and sold as having synthetic faux fur, were documented as actually containing real fur from common raccoon dogs.

On 22 December 2006, MSNBC reported Macy's had pulled from its shelves and its website two styles of Sean John hooded jackets, originally advertised as featuring faux fur, after an investigation concluded garments were actually made from common raccoon dog.

On 24 April 2008, the Humane Society of the United States (HSUS) filed a false-advertising complaint with the US Federal Trade Commission alleging at least 20 retailers in the U.S. had been mislabeling common raccoon dog fur. They assert 70% of fur garments they tested were common raccoon dog, but were mislabeled as faux fur, coyote, rabbit, or other animals. In December 2009, Lord & Taylor announced new regulations banning the sale of common raccoon dog fur in its stores.

On 19 March 2013, three U.S. retailers settled lawsuits with the U.S. government following an investigation that confirmed they had been selling common raccoon dog fur, but labeling it as fake ('faux') fur. Neiman Marcus, DrJays.com, and Eminent (Revolve Clothing) reached settlements with the U.S. Federal Trade Commission that do not incur financial penalties unless they mislabel the fur again.

On 19 September 2014, the HSUS announced Kohl's had been selling common raccoon dog fur as faux fur.

== See also ==
- Raccoon in Japan
