= Florence Débarre =

Professor at the French National Centre for Scientific Research

- Education: Montpellier 2 University (PhD); Pierre and Marie Curie University
- Scientific career
- Thesis: Living, competing and evolving in a heterogeneous environment (2010)
- Doctoral advisor: Sylvain Gandon
- Website: www.normalesup.org/~fdebarre/

Florence Débarre (born 1984 in Paris, France) is a director of research at the French National Centre for Scientific Research (CNRS). She is a researcher in the field of Evolutionary biology.

== Education and career ==
Débarre completed her doctorate in 2010 at Montpellier 2 University. After postdoctoral research in Canada at the University of British Columbia, she joined the University of Exeter in England in 2013. She moved to CNRS in 2015, and earned a habilitation in 2019.

She is affiliated with the Institut d'écologie et des sciences de l'environnement de Paris.

== COVID-19 research ==
During the pandemic, Débarre spoke on the transmission rates of different variants of the COVID-19 illness.

In early February 2022, Débarre was one of the experts questioned by the French National Assembly on the COVID-19 pandemic.

In early 2023, Débarre found genetic information on GISAID which had been collected around the Huanan Seafood Wholesale Market by the Chinese Center for Disease Control and Prevention shortly after the outbreak of COVID-19 but had only recently been published. The samples that contained those genetics had been secured from, among other places, traders' appliances and equipment at the market. A sample included SARS-CoV-2 virus RNA and Common raccoon dog DNA, leading Débarre and colleagues to the conclusion that the origin of the disease was most likely natural Zoonosis. Unfortunately, the animals in question had already been removed from the market at the time of testing, so Débarre explained that irrefutable proof for a Zoonosis could not be delivered.

Débarre was attacked on social media by proponents of the COVID-19 lab leak theory, who reject the idea of zoonosis as a source for the pandemic.

In 2024 Débarre led research published in Cell that provided further evidence of the zoonotic origin of the pandemic.

== Honors and awards ==
Débarre was a 2022 recipient of the CNRS Bronze Medal.

== Selected publications ==
- Débarre, F.; Hauert, C.; Doebeli, M. (6 March 2014). "Social evolution in structured populations" (PDF). Nature Communications. 5 (1): 3409. Bibcode:2014NatCo...5.3409D. doi:10.1038/ncomms4409. ISSN 2041-1723. PMID 24598979.
- Crits-Christoph, Alexander; Levy, Joshua I.; Pekar, Jonathan E.; Goldstein, Stephen A.; Singh, Reema; Hensel, Zach; Gangavarapu, Karthik; Rogers, Matthew B.; Moshiri, Niema; Garry, Robert F.; Holmes, Edward C.; Koopmans, Marion P. G.; Lemey, Philippe; Peacock, Thomas P.; Popescu, Saskia; Rambaut, Andrew; Robertson, David L.; Suchard, Marc A.; Wertheim, Joel O.; Rasmussen, Angela L.; Andersen, Kristian G.; Worobey, Michael; Débarre, Florence (19 September 2024). "Genetic tracing of market wildlife and viruses at the epicenter of the COVID-19 pandemic". Cell. 187 (19): 5468–5482.e11. doi:10.1016/j.cell.2024.08.010. ISSN 0092-8674. PMC 11427129. PMID 39303692.
- Débarre, Florence (25 February 2025). "The 'lab-leak origin' of Covid-19. Fact or fiction?". The Conversation.
- Débarre, Florence; Praz, Françoise, eds. (2024). L'ère des pandémies : Covid, les avancées de la recherche. Paris: CNRS le Cherche midi. ISBN 9782749177984.
- Débarre, Florence; Hensel, Zach (4 September 2025). "Theories of the origin of SARS-CoV-2 in the light of its continuing evolution". Comptes Rendus. Biologies (in French and English). 348: 189–209. doi:10.5802/crbiol.183.
