= Akodessawa Fetish Market =

Market in Togo

Coordinates: 6.1576°N 1.2671°E

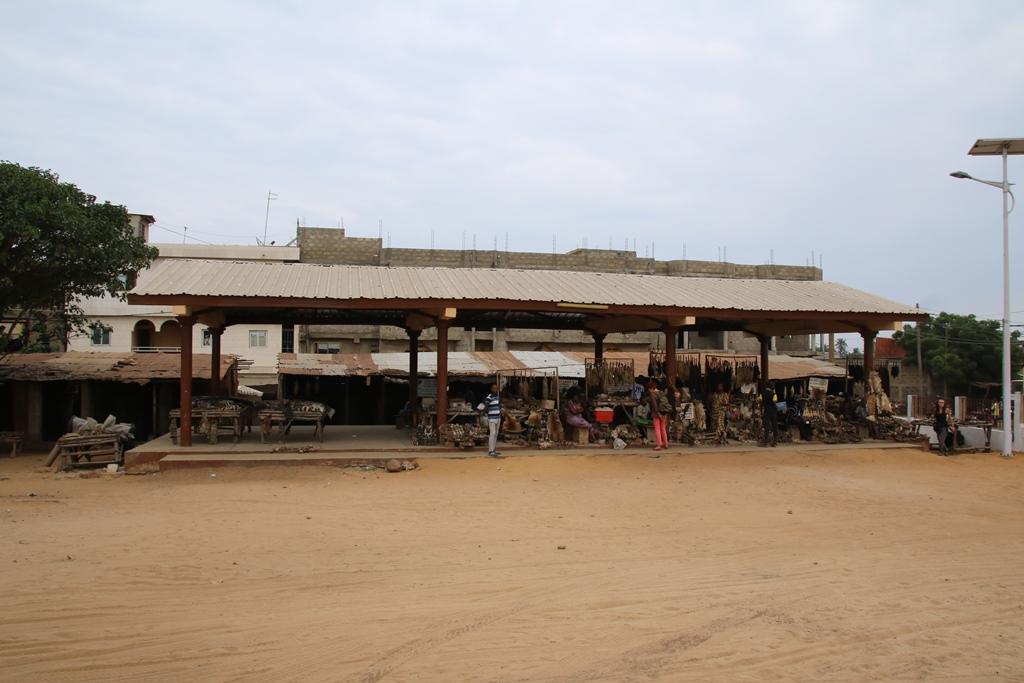
Akodessewa Fetish Market 2016

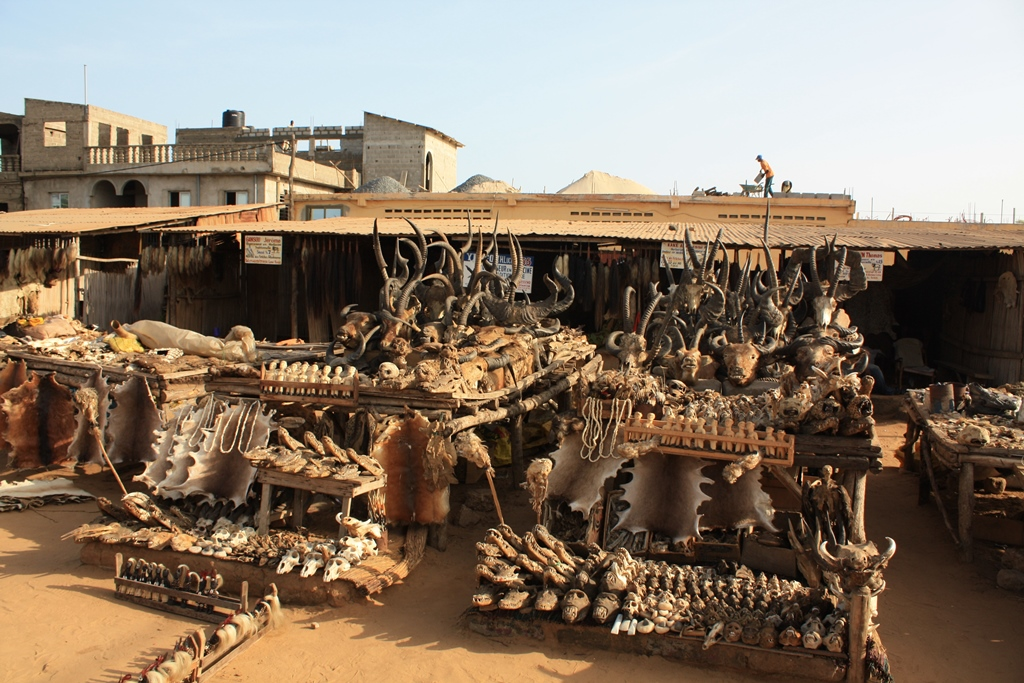
Akodessewa Fetish Market 2008

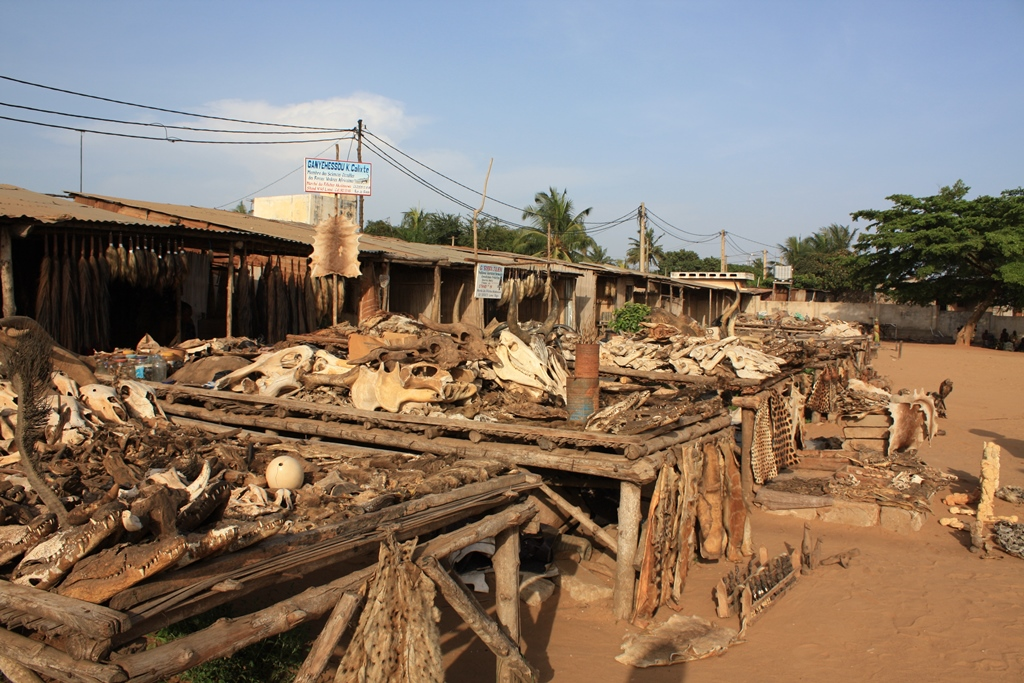
Akodessewa Fetish Market 2008

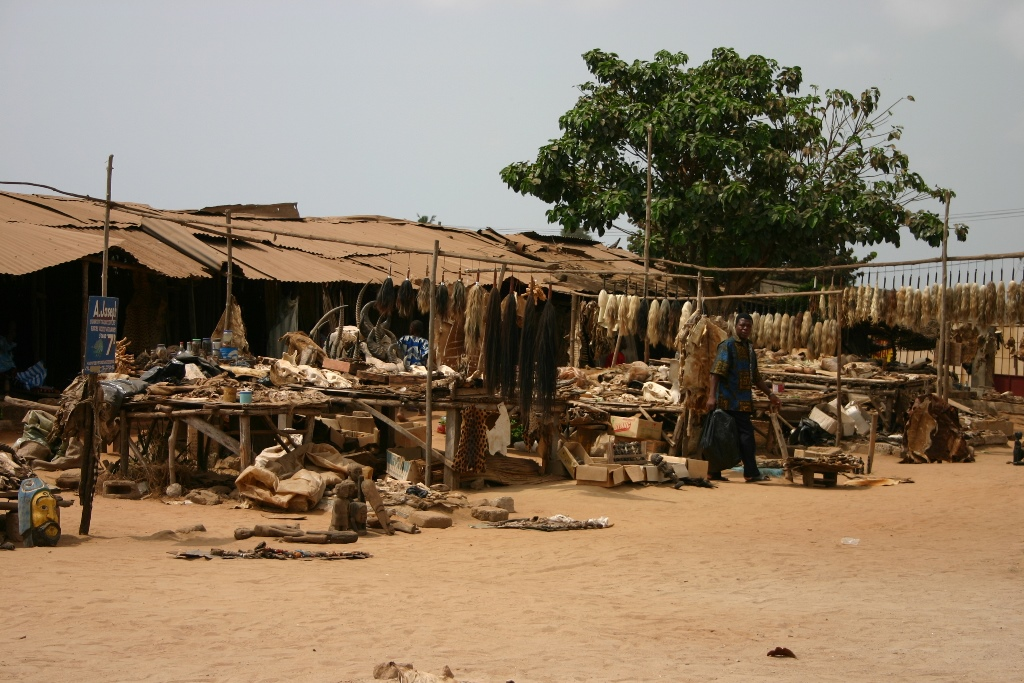
Akodessewa Fetish Market 2005

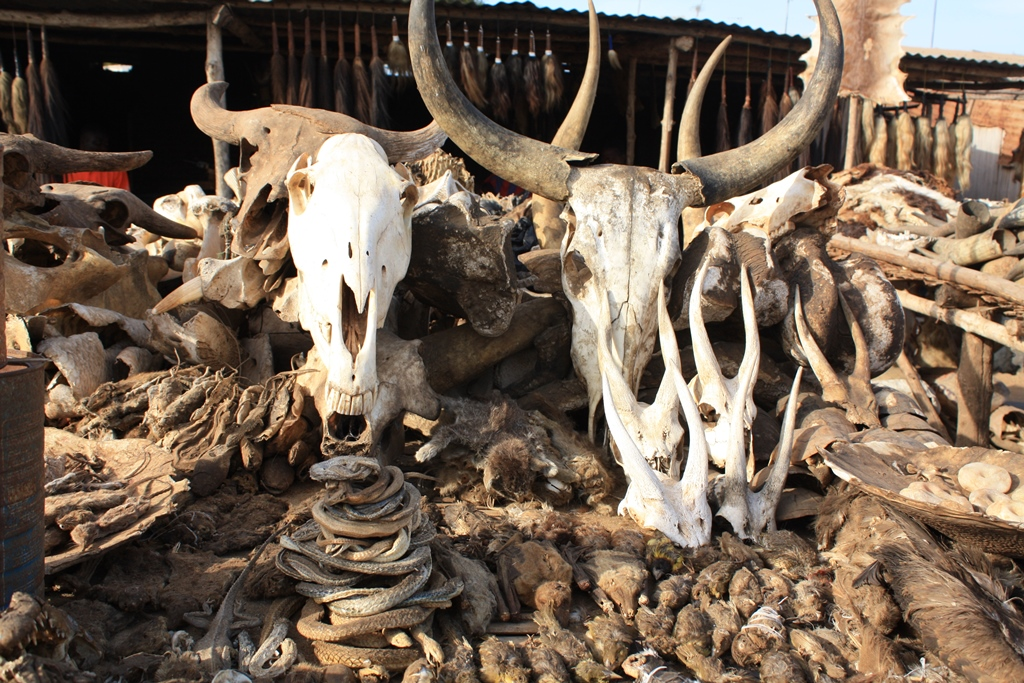
Skulls of various animal species

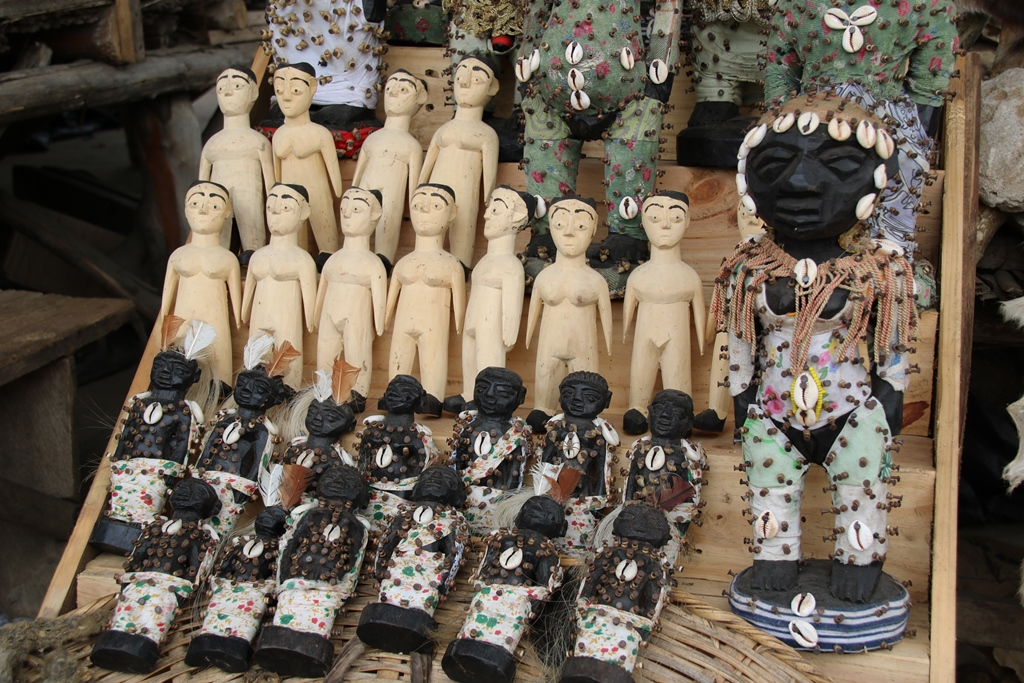
Voodoo Dolls

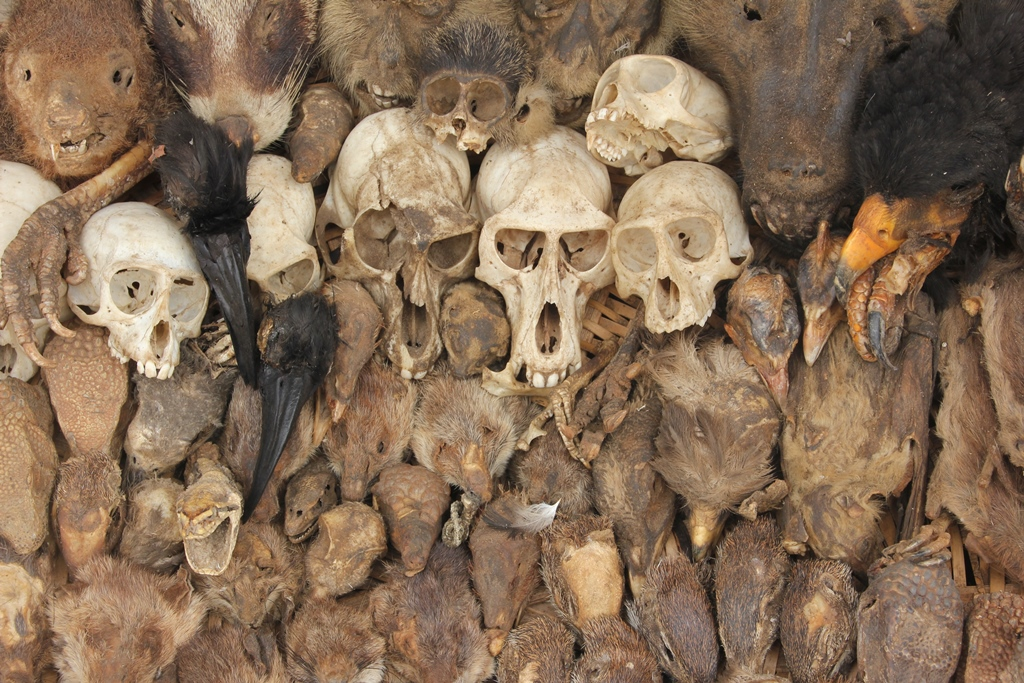
Skulls for Voodoo rituals

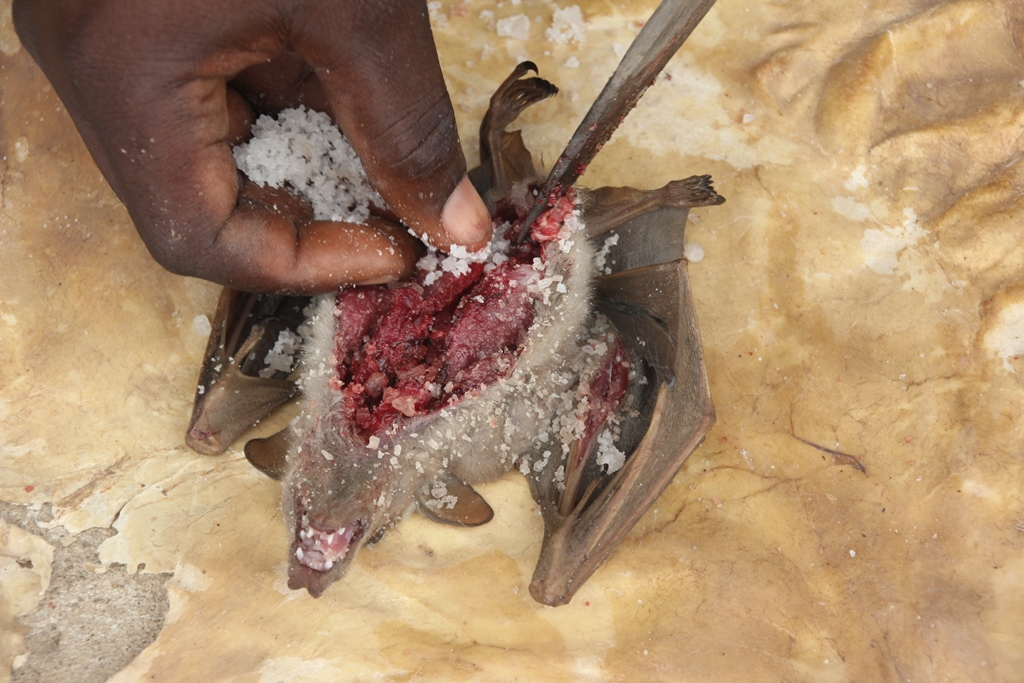
Preparation of a bat at Akodessewa Fetish Market for Voodoo rituals

The Akodessewa Fetish Market (French: Marché des Féticheurs) is located at Akodessewa, which is a district of Lomé, the capital of Togo in West Africa. The Akodessewa Fetish Market is the world's largest voodoo market.

The market sells fetishes used in vodún religious practice such as monkey heads, skulls, dead birds, crocodiles, skins and other products of dead animals.

== Voodoo ==
Voodoo has a long tradition in Togo. Centuries ago, slaves from Africa brought Yoruba gods to the Caribbean and South America. There it came to mixing of African gods with the saints of Christianity and the symbols of the Catholic Church. In course of time they changed their meaning. When former slaves and their families migrated to West Africa they developed a voodoo cult in the country of origin of their families.

== Fetish ==
The fetish is comparable to the Orisha of Yoruba. A fetish can be God, but also human, plant, animal or material. This depends on the ritual and the situation. In the ritual, the fetish is activated and strengthened. Fetishes may have been special people.

== Literature ==
- Voodoo Africaá Secret Power, 1980, ISBN 978-3853990131
- Afrika. Die Magier der Erde, Studienverlag 2010, ISBN 978-3-7065-4983-7
- The Last Africans, 1977, ISBN 978-3853990025
- Afrika, Asien- Kunst- und Ritualobjekte, 1997, ISBN 3-85218-244-1
- Die Medizin der schwarzen Götter, 1997, ISBN 3-85218-258-1
- Die Medizin der schwarzen Götter: Magie und Heilkunst Afrikas, 1989, ISBN 3-224-16571-5
