= Human uses of bats =

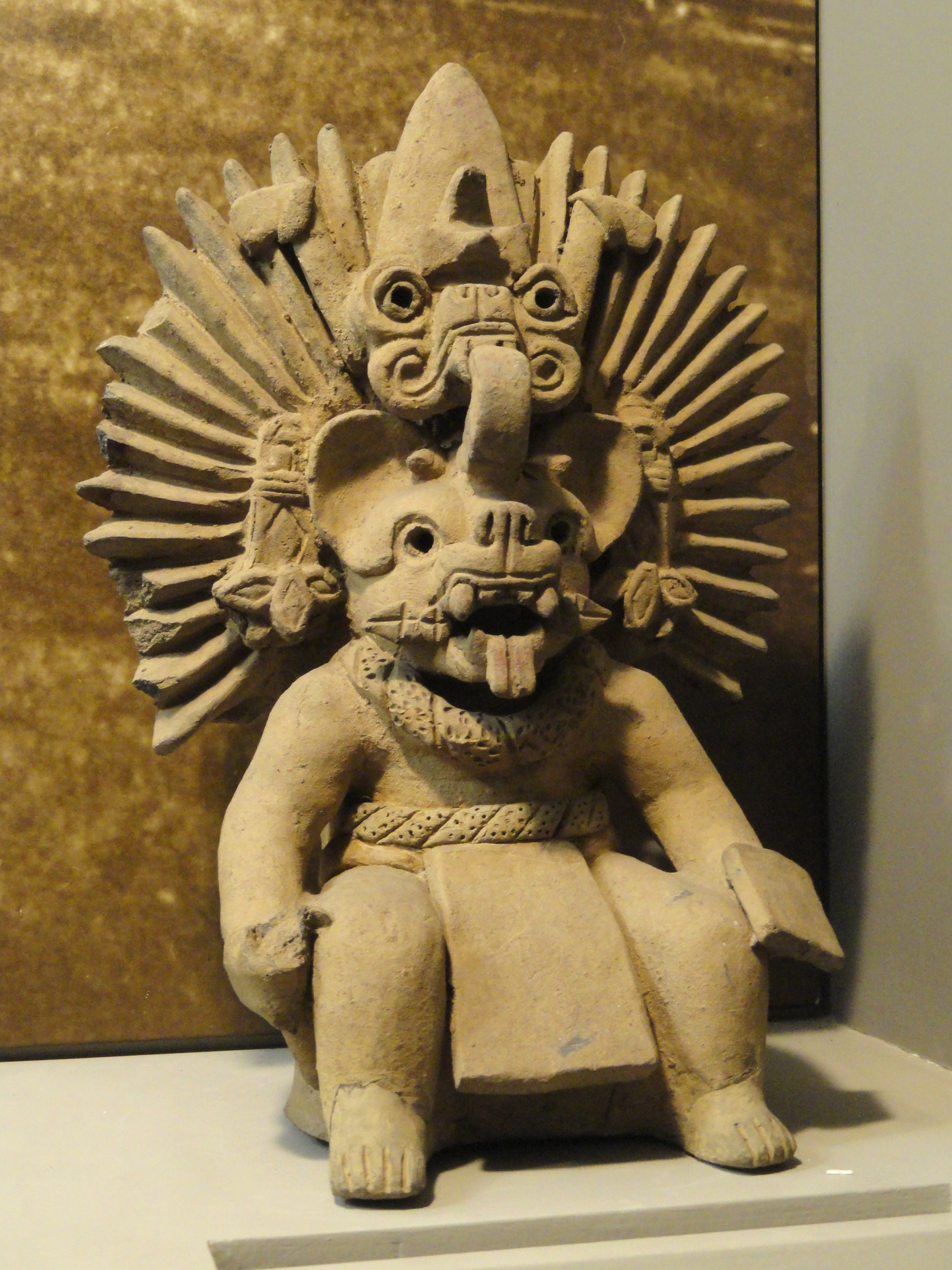
A Zapotec bat god figure, dating from 350–500 CE

Human uses of bats include economic uses such as bushmeat or in traditional medicine. Bats are also used symbolically in religion, mythology, superstition, and the arts. Perceived medical uses of bats include treating epilepsy in South America, night blindness in China, rheumatism, asthma, chest pain, and fever in South Asia. Bat meat is consumed in Oceania, Australia, Asia, and Africa, with about 13% of all species hunted for food. Other economic uses of bats include using their teeth as currency on the island of Makira.

Bats are widely represented in the arts, with inclusion in epic poems, plays, fables, and comic books. Though frequently associated with malevolence in Western art, bats are symbols of happiness in China.

== Economic uses ==
=== Traditional medicine ===
Live bats are sold in Bolivia for purported medicinal uses. Specifically, consuming the bats' blood is believed to treat epilepsy. A 2010 study documented that per month, 3,000 bats were sold in markets in four Bolivian cities. Species sold in these markets include Seba's short-tailed bats, mouse-eared bats, and common vampire bats. Bat excrement (guano) is used in traditional Chinese medicine as a treatment for night blindness. The Romans believed that bat blood was an antidote for snake venom.

Flying foxes are killed for use in traditional medicine. The Indian flying fox, for example, has many perceived medical uses. Some believe that its fat is a treatment for rheumatism. Tribes in the Attappadi region of India eat the cooked flesh of the Indian flying fox to treat asthma and chest pain. Healers of the Kanda Tribe of Bangladesh use hair from Indian flying foxes to create treatments for "fever with shivering."

=== Meat ===
Bats are consumed for their meat in several regions, including Oceania, Australia, Southeast Asia, China, and West and Central Africa. Bats have been used as a food source for humans for thousands of years. At least 167 species of bats are hunted around the world, or about 13% of all bat species.

=== Materials ===
Indigenous societies in Oceania used parts of flying foxes for functional and ceremonial weapons. In the Solomon Islands, people created barbs out of their bones for use in spears, and still use their dry skins to make kites. In New Caledonia, ceremonial axes made of jade were decorated with braids of flying fox fur.

There are modern and historical references to flying fox byproducts used as currency. In New Caledonia, braided flying fox fur was once used as currency. On the island of Makira, which is part of the Solomon Islands, indigenous peoples still hunt flying foxes for their teeth as well as for bushmeat. The canine teeth are strung together on necklaces that are used as currency. Teeth of the insular flying fox are particularly prized, as they are usually large enough to drill holes in. The Makira flying fox is also hunted, though, despite its smaller teeth.

=== Fertilizer ===
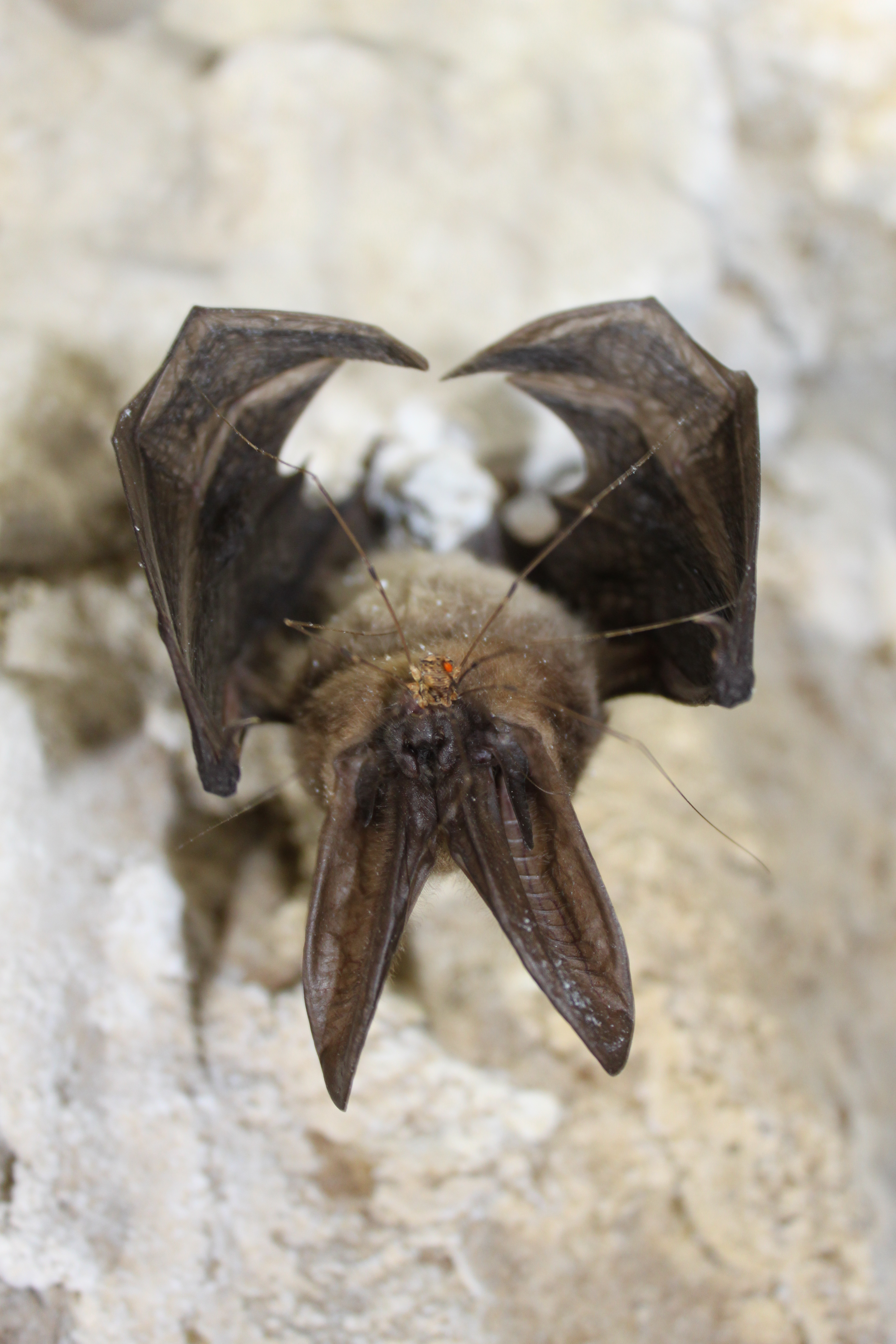
Bat eating pests in its natural environment.

Bat guano is a natural fertilizer used by gardeners and plant enthusiasts across the world. Bat guano is a natural and organic fertilizer that not only benefits the plants, but also benefits the bats as many gardeners will build bat houses to house the bats, their natural fertilizer supplier. Bat guano contains many elements that benefit plant growth: carbon, nitrogen, sulfur, and phosphorus. Therefore, because of its natural properties, guano has become very popular across the world for its use as a natural and organic fertilizer.

=== Pest control ===
Bats can eat up to 3,000 insects a night and are becoming increasingly more common among neighborhoods to use as natural pest control. Especially for communities at high risk of diseases such as zika, West Nile virus, and St. Louis encephalitis, bats can decrease the population of mosquitoes and other pests naturally, without the use of pesticides. Bats also perform important pest control for farmers, cutting down the numbers of pests that eat and destroy their crops. Farmers in turn are protective of bats and often have bat houses near their crop fields to help attract and house bats for their natural pest control.

== Symbolic uses ==
=== Mythology, religion, and superstition ===
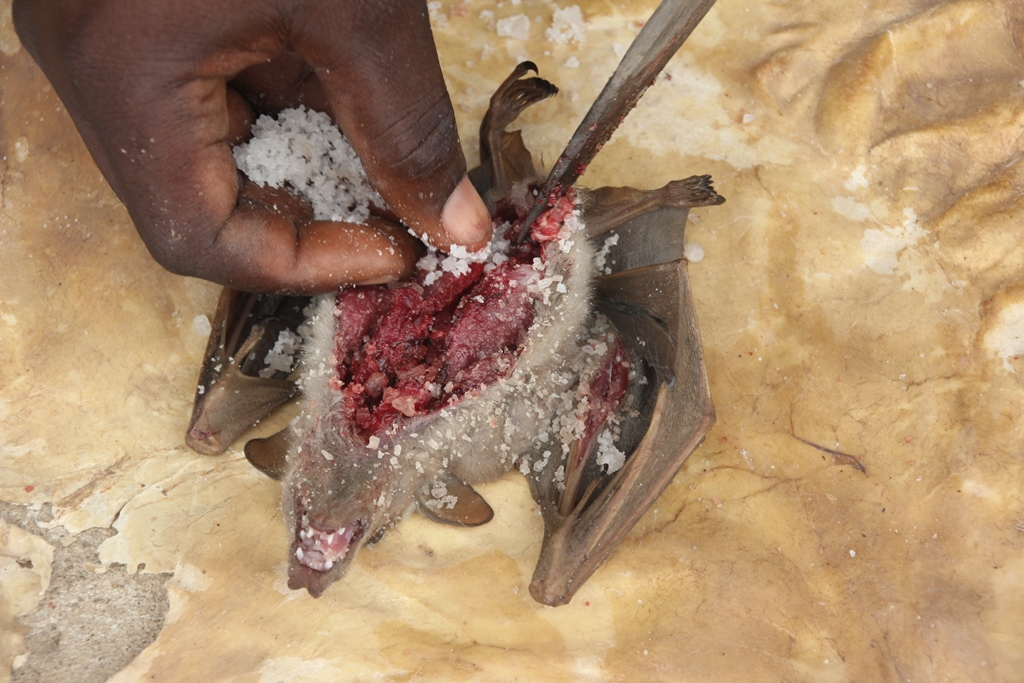
Preparation of a bat at Akodessawa Fetish Market in Togo, West Africa, for Voodoo rituals

In Mayan mythology, the deity Camazotz was a bat god. "Camazotz" translates to "death bat" or "snatch bat". Though many superstitions related to bats are negative, some are positive. In Ancient Macedonia, people carried amulets made out of bat bones. Bats were considered the luckiest of all animals, thus their bones were sure to bring good luck. In China, bats are also considered good luck or bringers of happiness, as the Chinese word Fu is a homophone for both "bat" and "happiness". Flying fox wings were depicted on the war shields of the Asmat people of Indonesia; they believed that the wings offered protection to their warriors. The 10th century Geoponica stated that affixing a bat's head to a dovecote would prevent domestic pigeons from straying, and Pliny the Elder's Natural History asserted that carrying a bat three times around a room and then nailing it head-down to a window would magically protect sheep pens.

Bats are associated with negative uses or beings in many cultures. In Nigeria, for example, bats are thought of as witches; in Ivory Coast, they are believed to be ghosts or spirits. In the Bible's Book of Leviticus, bats are referred to as "birds you are to regard as unclean," and therefore should not be consumed.

=== Arts ===
Bats have a long history of inclusion in the arts. The Ancient Greek playwright Aristophanes is believed to have been the first to allude to bats coming from hell in 414 BC, leading to the popular expression "bat out of hell". The Greek storyteller Aesop used bats as characters in two of his Fables, and bats appear twice in the Ancient Greek epic poem the Odyssey. One of the most famous bat-inspired characters is Batman, a superhero who debuted via American comic book in 1939. In more recent times, bats are main characters in the children's book Stellaluna (1993) and the Silverwing series (1997 – 2007).

Bats in Chinese art: Desk Album- Flower and Bird Paintings (Bats, rocks, flowers oval calligraphy) by Zhang Ruoai, 18th century

Bats are a popular component of natural horror genre films and books. In 1897, author Bram Stoker wrote Dracula; the book and its film adaptations continued a legacy of bats being portrayed as "evil, bloodsucking monsters". Other natural horror films including bats are The Devil Bat (1940), Nightwing (1979), and Bats (1999).

In Chinese art, bats are used to symbolize happiness. A popular use of bats in Chinese art is the wufu, a depiction of a tree surrounded by five bats, symbolizing the five happinesses: good luck, health, wealth, longevity, and tranquility. Bats are similarly found on Chinese teacups, on greeting cards, in paintings, and in embroidery.

In theatre, bats are featured in the 1874 German operetta Die Fledermaus (The Bat in English). Die Fledermaus is unusual in Western culture in that bats are not portrayed as a symbol of malevolence. A 1920 play The Bat featured a villain called "the Bat".

=== Heraldry and branding ===
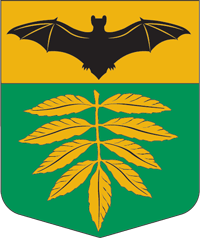
The coat of arms of Sesava Parish, Latvia

Bats are a common element of heraldry, particularly in Spain, France, Switzerland, Ireland, and England. Bats are frequently displayed with their wings outstretched, facing the observer. The use of bats in heraldry was meant to inspire fear in enemies, as well as symbolize vigilance.

The liquor company Bacardi prominently uses bats in its branding, with its main logo featuring a new world fruit bat. Several sports teams use bats in their logos, including Valencia CF (soccer) and the Louisville Bats (Minor League Baseball).

== See also ==
- Bat bombs
