= Matschie =

Matschie is a surname. Notable people with the surname include:

- Christoph Matschie (born 1961), German politician
- Jürgen Matschie (born 1953), German photographer
- Paul Matschie (1861–1926), German zoologist
