= History of coronavirus =

History of the virus group

The history of coronaviruses is an account of the discovery of the diseases caused by coronaviruses and the diseases they cause. It starts with the first report of a new type of upper-respiratory tract disease among chickens in the U.S. state of North Dakota, in 1931. The causative agent was identified as a virus in 1933. By 1936, the disease and the virus were recognised as unique from other viral disease. They became known as infectious bronchitis virus (IBV), but later officially renamed as Avian coronavirus.

A new brain disease of mice (murine encephalomyelitis) was discovered in 1947 at Harvard Medical School in Boston. The virus causing the disease was called JHM (after Harvard pathologist John Howard Mueller). Three years later a new mouse hepatitis was reported from the National Institute for Medical Research in London. The causative virus was identified as mouse hepatitis virus (MHV), later renamed Murine coronavirus.

In 1961, a virus was obtained from a school boy in Epsom, England, who was suffering from common cold. The sample designated B814 was confirmed as novel virus in 1965. New common cold viruses (assigned 229E) collected from medical students at the University of Chicago were also reported in 1966. Structural analyses of IBV, MHV, B814 and 229E using transmission electron microscopy revealed that they all belong to the same group of viruses. Making a crucial comparison in 1967, June Almeida and David Tyrrell invented the collective name coronavirus, as all those viruses were characterised by solar corona-like projections (called spikes) on their surfaces.

Other coronaviruses have been discovered from pigs, dogs, cats, rodents, cows, horses, camels, Beluga whales, birds and bats. As of 2022, 52 species are described. Bats are found to be the richest source of different species of coronaviruses. All coronaviruses originated from a common ancestor about 293 million years ago. Zoonotic species such as Severe acute respiratory syndrome-related coronavirus (SARS-CoV), Middle East respiratory syndrome-related coronavirus (MERS-CoV) and Severe acute respiratory syndrome-related coronavirus 2 (SARS-CoV-2), a variant of SARS-CoV, emerged during the past two decades and caused the first pandemics of the 21st century.

== Discovery of chicken coronavirus ==
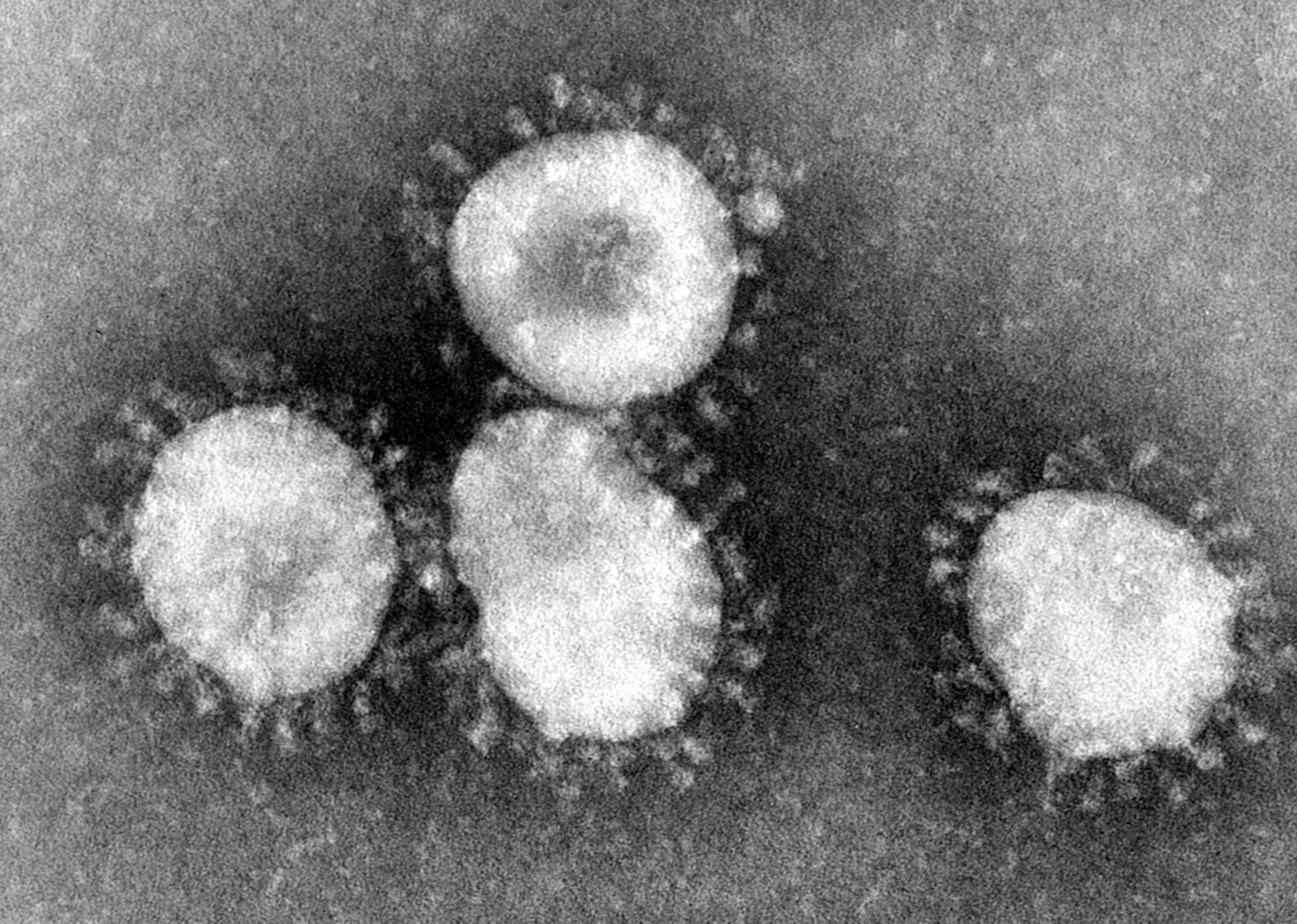
Electron microscopic image of Avian coronavirus.

Arthur Frederick Schalk and Merle C. Fawn at the North Dakota Agricultural College were the first to report what was later identified as coronavirus disease in chickens. Their publication in the Journal of the American Veterinary Medical Association in 1931 indicates that there was a new respiratory disease that mostly affected 2-day-old to 3-week-old chickens. They referred to the disease as "an apparently new respiratory disease of baby chicks." The symptoms included severe shortness of breath and physical weakness. The infection was contagious and virulent, easily transmitted through direct contact between chickens or experimental transfer of the bronchial exudates from infected to healthy chickens. The maximum mortality recorded was 90%.

The causative pathogen could not be identified. Charles D. Hudson and Fred Robert Beaudette at the New Jersey Agricultural Experiment Station in New Brunswick, New Jersey, put forth a hypothesis in 1932 that virus could be the cause and introduced the name as "virus of the infectious bronchitis." But this was a misattribution because at the time another related disease, known as infectious laryngotracheitis, was reported that exhibited almost similar symptoms but mostly affected adult chickens. As Beaudette later recalled in 1937, the disease he described was infectious layngotracheitis, saying: "Infectious laryngotracheitis is said to be the correct name for this disease rather than infectious bronchitis… Moreover, the gasping symptom ordinarily accepted as typical of the disease is also a prominent symptom in infectious bronchitis (gasping disease, chick bronchitis)." The names infectious bronchitis and infectious laryngotracheitis were till then used synonymously and interchangeably.

Unaware of the developments, Leland David Bushnell and Carl Alfred Brandly at the Kansas Agricultural Experiment Station studied a similar case which they called "gasping disease" due to the apparent symptom. They had known the disease since 1928. Their report in 1933 titled "Laryngotracheitis in chicks" published in the Poultry Science indicated a clear distinction of infectious bronchitis from infectious laryngotracheitis (cause by a herpes virus) as the main organ affected was the bronchi. The bronchi infection resulted in severe gasping and swift death due to inability to eat food. It was also found that the pathogens could not be bacteria or protozoans as they passed through membranes (Berkefield filter) that would block those pathogens. The isolation and identification of the pathogen as a virus was reported as:

In several experiments we have reproduced the disease in chicks by the intratracheal, subcutaneous and intraperitoneal injection of Berkefeld filtered material. The chicks developed typical gasping symptoms after various periods of incubation, different groups of chicks first showing symptoms in six, seventeen, nineteen, etc., days after receiving the filtrate... The disease may also be transferred by means of filtrates of spleen, liver, and kidney tissues and by the transfer of bacteriologically sterile blood.

This was the discovery of infectious bronchitis virus (IBV), the first coronavirus. But Bushnell and Brandy made an erroneous remark by saying, "The symptoms and lesions in the chicks [caused by IBV] are similar to those seen in so-called laryngotracheitis of adult birds and are probably due to the same agent."

In 1936, Jerry Raymond Beach and Oscar William Schalm at the University of California, Berkeley, reexamined Bushnell and Brady's experiment with a conclusion that infectious laryngotracheitis and infectious bronchitis with their causative viruses were different. (In 1931, Beach had discovered the virus of infectious laryngotracheitis, now called Gallid alphaherpesvirus 1.) They concluded that:

- It was found that chickens that recovered from an infection with one of the two strains of virus were refractory to further infection with either strain. It was also found that the sera from chickens that have recovered from an infection with one strain of the virus would neutralize virus of either strain. These results show the identity of the two strains of virus.
- Chickens refractory to infection with this virus were shown to be susceptible to the virus of laryngotracheitis. Likewise, chickens refractory to the latter virus were susceptible to the former. These results demonstrate that the two viruses are distinct from one another.

Hudson and Beaudette later in 1937 were able to culture IBV for the first time using chicken embryos. This specimen, known as the Beaudette strain, became the first coronavirus to have its genome completely sequenced in 1987.

== Discovery of mouse coronaviruses ==
In 1949, Francis Sargent Cheever, Joan B. Daniels, Alwin Max Pappenheimer Jr., and Orville T. Bailey investigated the case of brain disease (murine encephalitis) at the Department of Bacteriology and Immunology of Harvard Medical School in Boston. Two laboratory mice (Schwenktker strains) of 17 and 18 days old had flaccid paralysis and died. It was generally believed that the mice had murine encephalitis. By then it was known that murine encephalitis was caused by a picornavirus, called Theiler's virus, which was discovered by Max Theiler at the Rockefeller Foundation in New York in 1937. However, the Harvard scientists found that the two mice had unusual symptoms other than brain damage (demyelination). The mice had no visible illness or diarrhoea, which usually are associated with murine encephalitis. In addition, the causative virus was isolated from different organs including liver, spleen, lungs, and kidneys. This indicated that brain was not the primary target organ. Liver was particularly affected with severe tissue damage (necrosis), indicating hepatitis. The new virus was named JHM, after the initials of John Howard Mueller, a pioneer microbiologist at Harvard.

In the autumn of 1950 there was a sudden outbreak of fatal hepatitis among laboratory mice (Parkes or P strains) at the National Institute for Medical Research, Mill Hill, London. Alan Watson Gledhill and Christopher Howard Andrewes isolated the causative virus, which experimentally was highly infectious to healthy mice. They named the virus as "mouse hepatitis virus (MHV)." Gledhill called the experiments on the highly infectious nature of the virus as a "bizarre discovery".

In 1959, John A. Morris at the National Institutes of Health, Bethesda, discovered a new mouse virus, which he named H747, from samples in Japan. When he compared the virus with JHM and MHV using serological tests, he found that they were both antigenically related, for which he created a common name "hepatoencephalitis group of murine viruses." In 1961, Robert A. Manaker and his team at the National Cancer Institute, Bethesda, reported the discovery of a new virus (designated as MHV-A59) from murine leukemia virus-infected mice, remarking that it was a member of the hepatoencephalitis group. The virus primary cause fatal hepatitis and encephalitis. Pneumonia-causing rat coronavirus (RCV) discovered in 1970, and sialodacryoadenitis virus (SDAV), which infects nasal cavities, lungs, salivary glands and the Harderian gland in rats, discovered in 1972 were found to be the same kind of hepatoencephalitis viruses.

== Discovery of human coronaviruses ==
Human coronaviruses were discovered as one of the many causative viruses of common cold. Research on the study of common cold originated when the British Medical Research Council and the Ministry of Health established the Common Cold Research Unit (CCRU) at Salisbury in 1946. Directed by Andrewes, the research laboratory discovered several viruses such as influenza viruses, parainfluenza viruses and rhinoviruses that cause common cold.

David Arthur John Tyrrell joined CCRU in 1957 and succeeded Andrewes in 1962. He developed a technique for growing rhinoviruses using nasal epithelial cells for the first time in 1960. Based on the technique, his team soon after formulated a concept of broad categorisation of common cold viruses into two groups: one group, called H strain, could be maintained only in human-embryo-kidney cell culture, and another group, designated M strain, could be maintained both in human-embryo-kidney cell culture and monkey-embryo-kidney cell culture. By then many common cold viruses could be grown in either of these cell cultures and were accordingly classified as M or H strain.

During 1960–1961, Tyrrell's team collected throat swabs from 170 school boys having common cold at a boarding school in Epsom, Surrey. England. Among few samples that could not be cultured in any of the culture media, a specimen designated B814, collected on 17 February 1961, was particularly infectious among healthy volunteers. There was no evidence whether the pathogen in B814 was a bacterium or a virus as all bacterial and viral culture methods available showed negative results. In the early 1965, while visiting the University of Lund in Sweden to receive an honorary doctorate, Andrewes learned of Bertil Hoorn who had developed a culture method for viruses using human trachea tissue. Hoorn had successfully cultured influenza viruses. After learning about these developments from Andrewes, Tyrrell invited Hoorn to visit CCRU. Using the new culture method, they were able to grow many viruses which could not be maintained in other culture methods.

Then B814 could be maintained in the new human tracheal culture and experimentally passed on to healthy volunteers by nasal inoculation. It was possible to confirm the nature of the pathogen as a filter-passing virus as it was susceptible to ether treatment (indicating a lipid-enveloped virus), able to induce cold in antibiotic-treated volunteers (indicating it was not a bacterium), and grown in human-embryo-trachea epithelial cell culture. Serological tests (antigen-antibody reactions) further indicated that the virus was not related (not reactive) to antibodies (serotypes) of any known viruses at the time. Reporting in the 5 June 1965 issue of the British Medical Journal, Tyrrell and Malcolm L. Bynoe concluded:

After considerable initial doubts we now believe that the B814 strain is a virus virtually unrelated to any other known virus of the human respiratory tract, although, since it is ether-labile, it may be a myxovirus.

But they contradicted themselves regarding the identity of the virus as they mentioned in the experimental results, saying:

It was concluded that B814 did not belong to any of the serotypes of myxovirus used, but might be distantly related to influenza C or Sendai viruses.

In an independent research in US, Dorothy Hamre and John J. Procknow studied respiratory tract infection among medical students at the University of Chicago. In 1962, they obtained five samples that were associated with very different symptoms, causing mild cold only, and could be cultured only in secondary human kidney tissue in contrast to other cold viruses which could be maintained in monkey-embryo-kidney cell culture. Serological test indicated they were not myxoviruses (Orthomyxoviridae). They presented their discovery as "A new virus isolated from the human respiratory tract" in the Proceedings of the Society for Experimental Biology and Medicine in 1966. They further studied one sample, designated 229E, grown in human diploid cell culture (Wi-38) and described its developmental stages using transmission electron microscopy to show that it was new type of virus.

== Discovery of the structure ==
Structural model of a coronavirus

Viruses cannot be seen normally with light microscopes. It was only with the development of electron microscopy that viruses could be visualised and structurally elucidated. Reginald L. Reagan, Jean E. Hauser, Mary G. Lillie, and Arthur H. Craige Jr. of the University of Maryland were the first to describe the structure of coronavirus using the transmission electron microscopy. In 1948, they reported in The Cornell Veterinarian that IBV was spherical in shape and some of them had filamentous projections. But the images were difficult to interpret due to poor resolution and low magnification (at × 28,000). Their subsequent studies did not show any striking properties from other viruses. An important advancement was made by Charles Henry Domermuth and O.F. Edwards at the University of Kentucky in 1957 when they observed IBVs as "ring or doughnut-shaped structures."

D.M. Berry at the Glaxo Laboratories, Middlesex, UK, with J.G. Cruickshank, H.P. Chu and R.J.H. Wells at the University of Cambridge published a more comprehensive and better electron microscopic images in 1964. Four strains of IBV, including Beaudette strain, were compared with influenza virus, with which they share most resemblance. In contrast to influenza virus in which the projections were small and straight, all IBV strains had "pear-shaped projections", which were names the "spikes" and described as:

These "spikes" were often seen over part of the surface only and were less densely packed than those seen in influenza viruses. They varied considerably in shape. Commonly they appeared to be attached to the virus by a very narrow neck and to thicken towards their distal ends, sometimes forming a bulbous mass 90-110 Å in diameter.

J. F. David-Ferreira and R. A. Manaker from the National Cancer Institute, Bethesda, were the first to study the structure of MHV in 1965. They also observed the surface projections as on IBV, stating, "The outer surface of the particle is covered by 'spicules'."

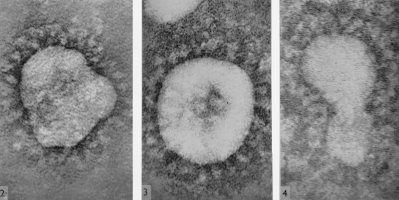
Transmission electron microscopic images of coronaviruses 229E (2), B814 (3) and IBV (4)

In 1966, Tyrrell sought the help of Anthony Peter Waterson at the St Thomas's Hospital Medical School in London who had recruited June Dalziel Almeida as an electron microscopist. While working as a technician at the Ontario Cancer Institute, University of Toronto, Canada, Almeida had developed two unique techniques for electron microscopy of viruses: the first was a modified negative staining method using phosphotungstic acid, and the next was immunological procedure in which she reacted viruses with antibodies (antigen-antibody complexes). Employing these techniques, she had successfully identified IBV and MHV as structurally distinct viruses, but her manuscript was rejected upon a referee's decision that the images were probably of influenza virus, and thus, lacked novelty.

Tyrrell supplied the human virus samples B814 and 229E, which Almeida analysed using transmission electron microscopy. The human viruses showed the same fundamental structures with that of a chicken virus (IBV). Almeida and Tyrrell published their findings in the April 1967 issue of the Journal of General Virology, in which they concluded:

Probably the most interesting finding from these experiments was that two human respiratory viruses, 229 E and B814 are morphologically identical with avian infectious bronchitis. Their biological properties, as far as they are known, are consistent with this. Both the human viruses are ether sensitive as is avian infectious bronchitis 229 E, have a similar size by filtration and multiply in the presence of an inhibitor of DNA synthesis.

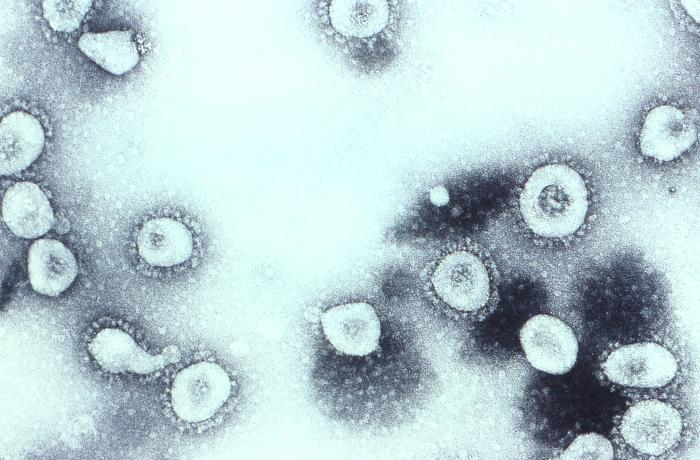
Electron microscopic image of human coronavirus OC43 (Betacoronavirus 1)

In 1967, Kenneth McIntosh and co-workers at the National Institute of Health, Bethesda, reported the structure of common cold viruses they collected from fellow workers during 1965–1966. They found six of their samples had common characters with B814. Two samples (designated OC38 and OC43, as the number of specimen in organ culture) were particularly virulent and caused encephalitis in experimental mice. They compared the structure of one of their samples numbered 501 (OC43) with those of 229E, IBV and influenza virus. It was so identical to IBV that they called the human viruses as "IBV-like viruses". They made a definitive description as:

All "IBV-like" viruses, 229E, and IBV itself show the following characteristics: (1) an over-all diameter of 160 mμ with a variation of ± 440 mμ; (2) a moderate pleomorphism with resultant elliptical, round, or tear-drop shapes but no filamentous or "tailed" forms; (3) characteristic spikes 20 mμ long, usually club- or pear-shaped narrow at the base and 10 mμ wide at the outer edge, spaced widely apart and distributed fairly uniformly about the circumference of the particle.

== Invention of the name and history of the taxonomy ==
By mid-1967 it was recognised that IBV, MHV, B814 and 229E were structurally and biologically similar so that they form a distinct group. Tyrrell met Waterson and Almeida in London to decide on the name of the viruses. Almeida had earlier suggested the term "influenza-like" because of their resemblance, but Tyrrell thought it inappropriate. Almeida came up with a novel name "coronavirus". Tyrrell wrote of his recollection in Cold Wars: The Fight Against the Common Cold in 2002:

Even though we could only base our judgement on the electron microscope images we were quite certain that we had identified a previously unrecognised group of viruses. So what should we call them? 'Influenza-like' seem a bit feeble, somewhat vague, and probably misleading. We looked more closely at the appearance of the new viruses and noticed that they had a kind of halo surrounding them. Recourse to a dictionary produced the Latin equivalent, corona, and so the name coronavirus was born.

Proposal of the new name was submitted to and accepted by the International Committee for the Nomenclature of Viruses (ICNV, established in 1966). The 16 November 1968 issue of Nature reported the justification by J. D. Almeida, D.M. Berry, C.H. Cunningham, D. Hamre, M.S. Hofstad, L. Mallucci, K. McIntosh and D.A.J. Tyrrell as:

Particles [of IBV] are more or less rounded in profile; although there is a certain amount of polymorphism, there is also a characteristic "fringe" of projections 200 Å long, which are rounded or petal shaped, rather than sharp or pointed, as in the myxoviruses. This appearance, recalling the solar corona, is shared by mouse hepatitis virus and several viruses recently recovered from man, namely strain B814, 229E and several others... In the opinion of the eight virologists these viruses are members of a previously unrecognized group which they suggest should be called the coronaviruses, to recall the characteristic appearance by which these viruses are identified in the electron microscope.

Coronavirus was accepted as a genus name by ICNV in its first report in 1971. IBV was then officially designated the type species as Avian infectious bronchitis virus (but renamed to Avian coronavirus in 2009). The so-called "hepatoencephalitis group of murine viruses" were grouped into a single species named Mouse hepatitis virus, as approved in 1971. The species was merged with Rat coronavirus (discovered in 1970) and Puffinosis coronavirus (discovered in 1982) as Murine coronavirus in 2009. 229E and OC43 were collectively named Human respiratory virus but merged as Human coronavirus 229E (HCoV-229E) in 2009. The first discovered human coronavirus B814 was antigenically different from 229E and OC43, but it could not be propagated in culture and was exhausted during experiments in 1968, thus, was excluded in taxonomy. Coroniviridae was adopted as the family name in the ICNV (soon after renamed International Committee on Taxonomy of Viruses, ICTV) second report in 1975.

229E and OC43 were together named Human respiratory virus in the ICNV first report. The species was split into Human coronavirus 229E (HCoV-OC229E) and Human coronavirus OC43 (HCoV-OC43) in 1995. While HCoV-OC229E is retained as a valid species, HCoV-OC43 was merged with Porcine hemagglutinating encephalomyelitis virus (discovered in 1962), Bovine coronavirus (discovered in 1973), Human enteric coronavirus (discovered in 1975), Equine coronavirus (discovered in 2000) and Canine respiratory coronavirus (discovered in 2003) into a single species Betacoronavirus 1 in 2009.

Owing to increasing number and diversity of new species discovered, CTV split the genus Coronavirus in 2009 into four genera, Alphacoronavirus, Betacoronavirus, Deltacoronavirus, and Gammacoronavirus. As of 2022, there are 52 species of coronaviruses in the subfamily Orthocoronavirinae under the family Coronaviridae, of which seven are of humans while 45 are those of other animals such as pigs, dogs, cats, rodents, cows, horses, camels, Beluga whales, birds and bats. There are also 35 reported species which are yet to be assigned official names.

== Other human coronaviruses ==
=== Human coronavirus NL63 (HCoV-NL63) ===
HCoV-NL63 was discovered in January 2003 from a seven-month-old baby in Amsterdam, the Netherlands. The baby was suffering from bronchiolitis, coryza, conjunctivitis and fever. A year later, a comprehensive analysis of nasal swab samples was done from where it was found that a sample from an eight-month-old boy diagnosed in 1988 with pneumonia had a similar virus (HCoV-NL). The virus was independently described in 2005 as HCoV-NH following a discovery among a group of children having respiratory infection in New Haven, Connecticut, US. The origin of the virus remains a mystery, but it is closely related to tricolored bat (Perimyotis subflavus) coronavirus and can survive in bat cell lines, suggesting that it is derived from animals (zoonotic).

=== Human coronavirus HKU1 (HCoV-HKU1) ===
HCoV-HKU1 was discovered from a 71-year-old man in Hong Kong, China, who was suffering from pneumonia in January 2004. When samples (nasopharyngeal aspirates from pneumonia patients) collected between April 2004 to March 2005 were analysed in 2006, it was found that 13 individuals had HCoV-HKU1. The same year, the virus was subsequently reported from Australia, Europe, and the US.

=== Zoonotic coronaviruses ===
Coronaviruses that are transmitted from animals (zoonoses) are clinically the most important human coronaviruses as they are responsible for a series of global epidemics. There are two species of such coronaviruses:

==== 1. Severe acute respiratory syndrome-related coronavirus ====
Two distinct viruses are known under this species, namely SARS-CoV and SARS-CoV-2. SARS-CoV emerged as an acute respiratory syndrome in Guangdong Province, southern China, during 16 November 2002 to 28 February 2003. The syndrome was accompanied by pneumonia that was fatal in many cases. The infection was believed to have been contained in China, but an infected individual carried it to Hong Kong on 21 February and spread it in the hotel and hospital. The first clinical case outside China was reported on 26 February 2003 in Hanoi, Viet Nam. It rapidly spread to Southeast Asia, North America and Europe. The World Health Organization (WHO) notified an epidemic alert on 6 March 2003, referring to the disease as severe acute respiratory syndrome. The virus was identified as a novel coronavirus from Hong Kong in April, from Toronto in May, and at the Centers for Disease Control and Prevention (CDC) in the U.S. in May. In October, the samples from Guangdong were established as the prototype specimens, and the name SARS coronavirus (SARS CoV) was introduced. ICTV approved it as Severe acute respiratory syndrome coronavirus in 2004, and renamed it Severe acute respiratory syndrome-related coronavirus in 2009. By mid-July 2003, the infection subsided, and by then it had spread to 28 countries infecting 8096 people and causing 774 deaths. In October, in an attempt to identify the source of infection, it was found that the infection was acquired from the masked palm civets (Paguma larvata), Chinese ferret-badgers (Melogale moschata) and raccoon dogs (Nyctereutes procyonoides), which were sold at a live-animal market in Guangdong. Further studies in 2005 showed that civets were the intermediate reservoirs of the virus, and horseshoe bats (Rhinilophus species) were the natural hosts.

Infection with SARS-CoV-2 was known from cases of atypical pneumonia in Wuhan city, China. The Wuhan Municipal Health Commission reported 27 individuals having "viral pneumonia" on 31 December 2019. The first known case was recorded on 12 December. The first case outside China was in Thailand on 13 January. WHO adopted the name of the disease as "coronavirus disease 2019" (COVID-19) on 11 February 2020, and used "2019 novel coronavirus" or "2019-nCoV" for the virus. On 2 March 2020, ICTV published the formal description and gave the official name as Severe acute respiratory syndrome-related coronavirus; thereby rendering the new virus as severe acute respiratory syndrome coronavirus 2 (SARS-CoV-2), while the former 2003 virus as SARS-CoV or SARS-CoV-1. WHO declared the infection as pandemic on 11 March, and since then has spread around the world, affecting over 676 million people and resulting in more than 6.88 million deaths. The source of the virus is not known. Malayan pangolins (Manis javanica) which are available in the live-animal market in Wuhan city has been studied as a probable source as the virus is closely related to the pangolin coronavirus. Genetic evidences show that the virus bears 93% nucleotide similarity with a novel coronavirus of Malayan horseshoe bat (Rhinolophus malayanus), and 96% identity with Bat SARS-like coronavirus RaTG13 of intermediate horseshoe bat (R. affinis). These data indicate that the virus most probably originated in bats. Given the differences between human and bat viruses, it is speculated that bat viruses were acquired through carrier intermediate hosts, which is especially fostered by the evidence that different mammals can be infected. Several animals have been investigated and are proven to be negative. Among the possible carriers are Malayan pangolins (Manis javanica) which are available in the live-animal market in Wuhan city and whose coronavirus is genetically related to the SARS-CoV-2. Rodents are also suspected as they are susceptible the viral infection. However, no animal is so far established as an intermediate host.

==== 2. Middle East respiratory syndrome-related coronavirus ====
In April 2012, the Ministry of Health, Jordan, reported an outbreak of acute respiratory illness affecting 11 people at a hospital in Zarqa. On 13 June 2012, a 60-year-old man having the symptoms was admitted to Dr. Soliman Fakeeh Hospital in Jeddah, Saudi Arabia. He was diagnosed with acute pneumonia and died on 24 June due to progressive respiratory and renal failure. His sputum sample showed the presence of coronavirus very similar to bat coronaviruses HKU4 and HKU5. The virus was named HCoV-EMC (after Erasmus Medical Center in Rotterdam, the Netherlands, where it was identified). Retrospective study of samples from the Jordan hospital revealed that the diseases and the virus were similar. WHO referred to the virus as the Middle East respiratory syndrome coronavirus (MERS-CoV) on 23 May 2013., which the ICTV adopted on 15 May 2013 (but modified it to Middle East respiratory syndrome-related coronavirus in 2016). In 2013, a study revealed that the virus was 100% genetically identical to the coronavirus of the Egyptian tomb bat (Taphozous perforatus coronavirus HKU4) from Bisha, Saudi Arabia, indicating its original source. In 2014, it was established that the virus was transmitted to humans by dromedary camels, which act as the intermediate hosts. By December 2019, the infection was confirmed in 2,499 individuals with 858 deaths (34.3% mortality) from 27 countries covering all continents.

== Other animal coronaviruses ==
=== Alphacoronavirus 1 ===
A viral infection in pigs, called transmissible gastroenteritis, which was characterised mainly by diarrhoea and vomiting and associated with high mortality, was first recognised by Leo Philip Doyle and Leslie Morton Hutchings of the Purdue University in Indiana, US, in 1946. Arlan W. McClurkin at the National Animal Disease Center, U.S. Department of Agriculture in Iowa, isolated and identified the virus in 1965. The virus was named Transmissible gastro-enteritis virus of swine in the ICNV first report in 1971, and changed to Porcine transmissible gastroenteritis virus (PTGV) in the second report in 1976.

In 1963, Jean Holzworth at the Angell Memorial Animal Hospital in Boston described a new intestinal disease of cats. In 1966, it was shown to cause inflammation of the abdomen in cats and was referred to as feline infectious peritonitis. Its causative virus was identified in 1968. Another cat coronavirus, feline enteric coronavirus, was reported in 1981 as closely related to feline infectious peritonitis virus, and was subsequently found to be more common, more innocuous and principally responsible for diarrhoea. In 1991, ICTV gave the name Feline infectious peritonitis virus (FIPV) to include both the viruses. It was generally assumed that the two viruses were distinct types; but in 1998, it was shown that feline infectious peritonitis virus arises from feline enteric virus by spontaneous mutation. A common name, Feline coronavirus (FCoV) was then widely used.

In 1974, a new coronavirus was discovered from U.S. military dogs, and was named by ICTV in 1991 as Canine coronavirus. PTGV, FIPV, and dog virus were shown to have apparent relatedness by the early 1990s. In 1998, a study revealed that FCoV originates from genetic recombination with Canine coronavirus. Based on the molecular and antigenic relationship of the viruses, the viruses of pigs, cats and dogs were merged into a single species and was renamed Alphacoronavirus 1 in 2009.

=== Porcine epidemic diarrhea virus ===
An acute infectious diarrhoea was first known in England in 1971 and was specifically among fattening pigs and sows. It was referred to as TOO (for "the other one") or TGE2 (for "transmissible gastroenteritis type 2") as the symptoms were similar to transmissible gastroenteritis. Other than causing rapid and acute diarrhoea, it was not a fatal disease. The case was first reported by John Godfrey Oldham in a letter to the editor of Pig Farming in 1972 using the title "Epidemic diarrhoea – How it all began". It was similar in symptoms to those of PTGV infection, but only affected piglets. It spread to the neighbouring countries and was referred to as epidemic viral diarrhea. A second outbreak occurred in 1976, and was called "porcine epidemic diarrhoea." It eventually spread throughout Europe. M. B. Pensaert and P. de Bouck at the Ghent University, Belgium isolated and identified the new coronavirus in 1978, and designated it CV777. ICTV officially renamed the virus Porcine epidemic diarrhea virus in 1995. An epidemic broke out from China in 2010 that spread throughout the world. A virulent strain emerged in U.S. between 2013 and 2015. It affected pigs of all ages, and mortality was as high as 95% among the suckling piglets. Another severe outbreak occurred in Germany in 2014 that spread to other European countries.

=== Bat coronaviruses ===
Reagan and his colleagues at the University of Maryland were the first to investigate bats as a potential sources of coronavirus in 1956. They experimentally inoculated 44 cave bats or little brown bats (Myotis lucifugus) with IBV and found that all of them developed the symptoms of infectious bronchitis. Their report reads:

50 percent of the bats exposed to the infectious bronchitis virus showed symptoms or death in the intracerebral, intraperitoneal, intradermal, intracardiac and intraocular groups; 75 percent in the intranasal and intrarectal groups; 100 percent in the intraoral group; and 25 percent intralingual and intramuscular group, whereas the controls appeared normal.

But nothing was known of the real nature of bats as reservoirs of coronaviruses until the epidemic of severe acute respiratory syndrome of humans in 2002/2003. Since the identification of SARS-CoV was identified in early 2003, and horseshoe bats as their natural hosts in 2005, bats have been extensively studied. Among all coronavirus hosts, bats are known to harbour the most variety, with more than 30 species identified. According to diversity estimate, there may be 3,200 species of coronaviruses in bats.

== Evolutionary history ==
It is not known with certainty when all coronaviruses evolved from the most recent common ancestor (MRCA). It is suggested that divergences of coronaviruses were the results of sequential genetic recombination in the ancestral species that confer an ability to infect animals other than their original hosts. The principal genetic target of recombination is the S gene that codes for the spike (S) protein essential for binding to the host's tissue, as well as orf8 that encodes an accessory protein. Phylogenetic analyses present contrasting estimates varying from thousands to million years. A study in 2012 suggested that the MRCA lived around 8,100 years ago. The four known genera Alphacoronavirus, Betacoronavirus, Gammacoronavirus, and Deltacoronavirus split up around 2,400 to 3,300 years ago into bat and avian coronavirus ancestors. Bat coronavirus gave rise to the species of Alphacoronavirus and Betacoronavirus that infect mammals, while avian coronavirus produced those of Gammacoronavirus and Deltacoronavirus that infect birds. However, a revised analysis indicates that the MRCA that could have lived around 190 to 489 (with a mean of 293) million years ago, and separation into new groups started a few million years after. A number of 2021 studies found that the MRCA for Coronaviruses may have emerged around 21,000–25,000 years ago in East Asia, during the earliest uncovered Coronavirus outbreak. Researchers found that 42 Coronavirus-specific virus-interacting proteins (CoV-VIPs) in East Asian populations were most likely selected for during this ancient outbreak, with the viruses driving an adaptive response in the ancestors of East Asians.

It is also not yet clear how coronaviruses jump from bats and birds to other animals. Some genetic evidences indicate that animal coronaviruses switch hosts from one mammal to another. For example, the coronaviruses of dog (Canine respiratory coronavirus), cattle (Bovine coronavirus), and human (HCoV-OC43) share over 98% similarities, suggesting their common origin from a single host. There is an evidence that HCoV-OC43 came from cattle around 1890, which makes it likely the first zoonotic coronavirus. Although no details are yet available, but it is generally believed that MERS-CoV originated from bat coronavirus and specifically suggested to have evolved from the common ancestor of BtCoV-HKU4 and BtCoV-HKU5, under the genus Betacoronavirus. Genetic estimate indicates that SARS-CoV-2 evolved from bat coronavirus in around 1948. Another estimate suggests SARS-CoV-2 shares a common ancestor with bat coronavirus RmYN02 in about 1976. SARS-CoV also possibly originated in around 1962 from the same horseshoe bats that harbours SARS-like coronaviruses. It was transmitted humans in around 1998 (4.08 years prior to the outbreak in 2003).
