= Wendy Barclay =

British virologist

Wendy Barclay CBE FMedSci
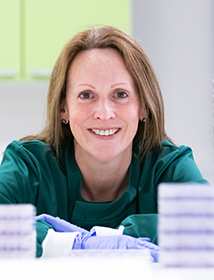
- Wendy Barclay in 2019
- Born: Wendy Sue Barclay
- Citizenship: United Kingdom
- Education: University of Cambridge (BA); University of Reading (PhD)
- Known for: Research of influenza virus
- Scientific career
- Fields: Virology
- Institutions: Imperial College London; Mount Sinai School of Medicine
- Thesis: The humoral immune response to rhinovirus infection (1988)
- Academic advisors: David Tyrrell; Fred Brown
- Website: www.imperial.ac.uk/people/w.barclay

Wendy Sue Fox CBE FMedSci (née Barclay) is a British virologist. She is currently head of Department of Infectious Disease and chair in Influenza Virology at Imperial College London. She leads a team of scientists studying the influenza virus and its physiology and morphology to discover novel vaccines. In particular, they are trying to understand more about influenza virus mutations, and how they can allow scientists to create new vaccines against possible flu pandemics.

== Education ==
Barclay graduated with a Bachelor of Arts (BA) degree in Natural Sciences from the University of Cambridge. For a postgraduate study, she conducted medical research at the Common Cold Unit in Salisbury, supervised by David Tyrrell and Fred Brown, for which she was awarded a Doctor of Philosophy (PhD) from the University of Reading in 1988: her doctoral thesis was titled "The humoral immune response to rhinovirus infection". At Reading, she was involved in human challenge studies with rhinovirus, to study the virus and its interaction with the human body.

== Research and career ==
After her PhD, Barclay held two postdoctoral research positions. One was with Professor Jeff Almond at the University of Reading, and the other was at Mount Sinai Medical Center in New York with Peter Palese. While at Reading, she learned many molecular virology skills that would help her to form the basis of her research career. At Mount Sinai, she was the first person to modify techniques for recovering recombinant influenza virus from cloned cDNA for the study of type B influenza virus.

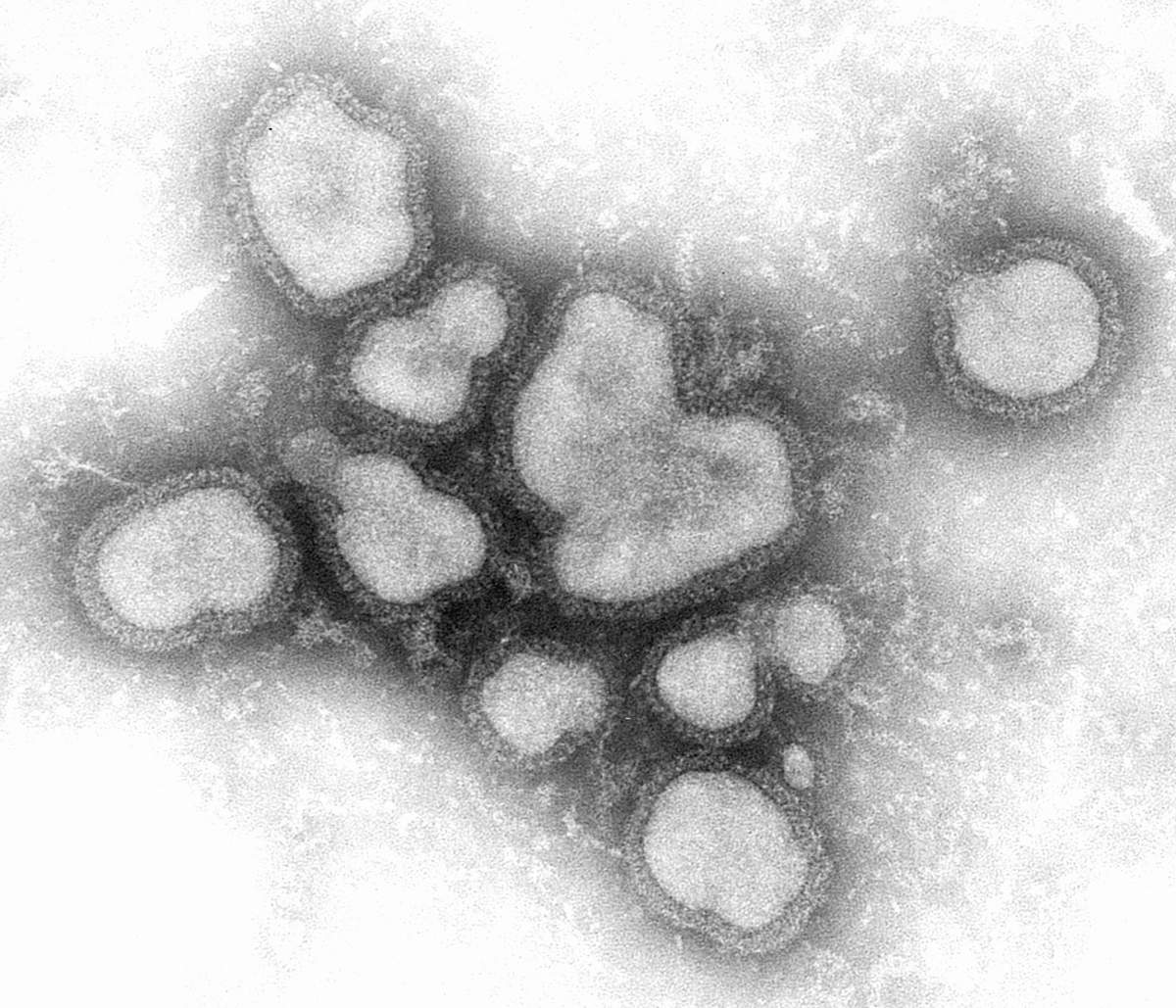
Influenza A virus – negative stain image TEM

At the start of her research career, Barclay worked with both rhinoviruses and various types of small RNA viruses. Barclay has worked mainly with the three types of virus: Influenza A virus, Influenza B virus, and Influenza C virus. All three belong to the family Orthomyxoviridae. Viruses that belong to this family are single stranded (-) RNA viruses that replicate within the nucleus of the host's cells. Influenza types A and B are routinely spread from human to human, and they are responsible for seasonal flu epidemics each year. Influenza type C virus causes mild respiratory infections and are not known to cause epidemics, unlike the other two. Barclay has worked intensively with Influenza A and Influenza B viruses for at least a decade. She has published many articles detailing the importance of understanding how influenza viruses interact with their hosts, understanding their genomic makeup, and understanding how different strains of the two viruses interact with host cells differently. She has also described some of the mechanisms of flu resistance to drugs.

In addition, she has written articles describing the importance of understanding how some viruses can cross species barriers to prevent another epidemic. In February 2015, CNN posted an article on its webpage that included statements made by Barclay. In it she told of her concerns about another possible flu pandemic, and how, if it ever did happen, it would spread fast and hard.

Barclay has been working on understanding and discovering more information about the relationship between pathogenesis and the influenza virus since her publication in 2006. She is trying to learn more about host range restrictions for the influenza virus, and its transmission between humans and animals as well as transmission between animal species. Barclay is also interested in studying influenza virus mutations, which allow scientists to create new vaccines against possible influenza pandemics. She is particularly keen on understanding the resistance mechanisms of antiviral compounds, and characterisation of novel cell substrates and attenuated virus backbones for influenza vaccines.

In January 2019, Wendy Barclay led an IdeasLab session at the World Economic Forum in Davos, Switzerland that focused on 'Developing a Vaccine Revolution', in which she spoke about the race to stop the next flu pandemic at source by preventing it from crossing from wild birds into chickens. Work with the Roslin Institute focused on blocking this transmission using novel molecular techniques.

=== Notable work, honours and awards ===
One of Barclay's most notable work involved looking at cells infected with the influenza A virus and identifying physiological RIG-I agonists. This article was published in Cell in 2010, and has been cited over 270 times. Research gathered for the article explained how one of the human cell's defences against RNA viruses comes in the form of RIG-Is. When a cell is infected with a RNA virus, RIG-I activation triggers an antiviral immune response. However, it was not fully known what part of the virus infection triggers RIG-I activation. Results of this study found that RIG-I activation is caused by the process of viral replication and correspond to full-length virus genomes, or single-stranded RNA viral genomes bearing 5′-triphosphates.

In 2016 she gave the Peter Wildy Prize Lecture in Virology on the subject of Influenza. She was elected a Fellow of the Academy of Medical Sciences in 2019 and was awarded the 2023 Microbiology Society Prize Medal by the Microbiology Society for her work.

Barclay was appointed Commander of the Order of the British Empire (CBE) in the 2022 New Year Honours for services to virology.

=== Memberships and editorial boards ===
- Committee member, Joint Committee on Vaccination and Immunization (Influenza Sub-group), Joint Committee on Vaccination and Immunization, Department of Health (DoH), 2008
- Committee member, Wellcome Trust basic Science Interview Committee
- Invited Member of panel, The peer review panel for animal work on influenza, Conference on Decision and Control (CDC) 2013, 2013 – 2013
- committee member, Scientific Programme Committee for Options for Control of Influenza, Options for Control of Influenza Conference, Cape Town, 2013
- Chair of the Virus Division, The Society For Microbiology, 2013
- Member, New and Emerging Respiratory Virus Threats Advisory Group

Barclay has served on several editorial boards including:

- PLOS Pathogens, guest editor
- The Journal of General Virology, member of the editorial board
- Virology, member of the editorial board

=== Media appearances ===
- World Economic Forum, Davos, Switzerland 2018: IdeasLab session on Developing a Vaccine Revolution
- BBC Future (Online) 2018 : Why the Flu of 1918 was so deadly
- Human Swarm (TV movie documentary), 2013; appeared as herself
- Horizon (UK TV series), 2013; appeared as herself
- Interviewed by Jim Al-Khalili on The Life Scientific on BBC Radio 4, first broadcast in 2018.
