= Hélio Gelli Pereira =

Brazilian-British virologist

Helio Gelli Pereira
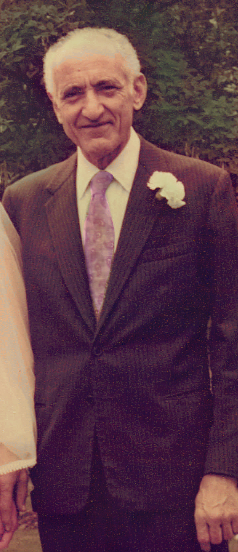
- Helio Gelli Pereira (1918-1994)
- Born: September 23, 1918; Petrópolis, Brazil
- Died: August 16, 1994 (aged 75); Rio de Janeiro, Brazil
- Citizenship: Brazilian, British
- Education: Faculdade Fluminense de Medicina, Fundação Oswaldo Cruz (FIOCRUZ), University of Manchester
- Known for: Co-authorship of Antigens and structure of the adenovirus paper, co-authorship and editing of Viruses of Vertebrates title
- Awards: Carlos J. Finlay Prize for Microbiology (1987)
- Scientific career
- Fields: Virology
- Workplaces: Fundação Oswaldo Cruz (FIOCRUZ), National Institute for Medical Research (NIMR), Animal Virus Research Institute in Pirbright, National Center for Infectious Diseases (CDC), Common Cold Unit

Hélio Gelli Pereira (September 23, 1918 – 16 August 1994) was a Brazilian-British virologist specialising in adenoviruses. Pereira was a co-recipient of the 1987 UNESCO Carlos J. Finlay Prize for Microbiology and was known for his work on the book, Viruses of Vertebrates. He contributed to several areas of virology in research and international public service.

== Early life and education ==
Pereira was born in the town of Petrópolis in the state of Rio de Janeiro to Raul Pereira Geronymo (Portuguese, via the Azores) and Maria Gelli Pereira, of Italian origin. His early years were spent in Petrópolis, where he was influenced by his Italian-Brazilian family.

Pereira began attending the Colégio Pitanga primary school in Rio de Janeiro in 1924 and then in 1928 moved to the Anglo-American School also in Rio de Janeiro. The school had no scientific facilities, and he believed that he barely passed his examinations. Despite this, Pereira entered the Faculty of Medicine in Niterói.

Although the school in Niterói also had poor scientific equipment, his teachers were enthusiastic and Pereira worked toward a microbiology degree with the help of Arlindo de Assis and A. Monteiro Filho. Halfway through the course, he worked part-time as a technician in the clinical pathology laboratory of a local hospital. In 1941, Pereira received his medical diploma.

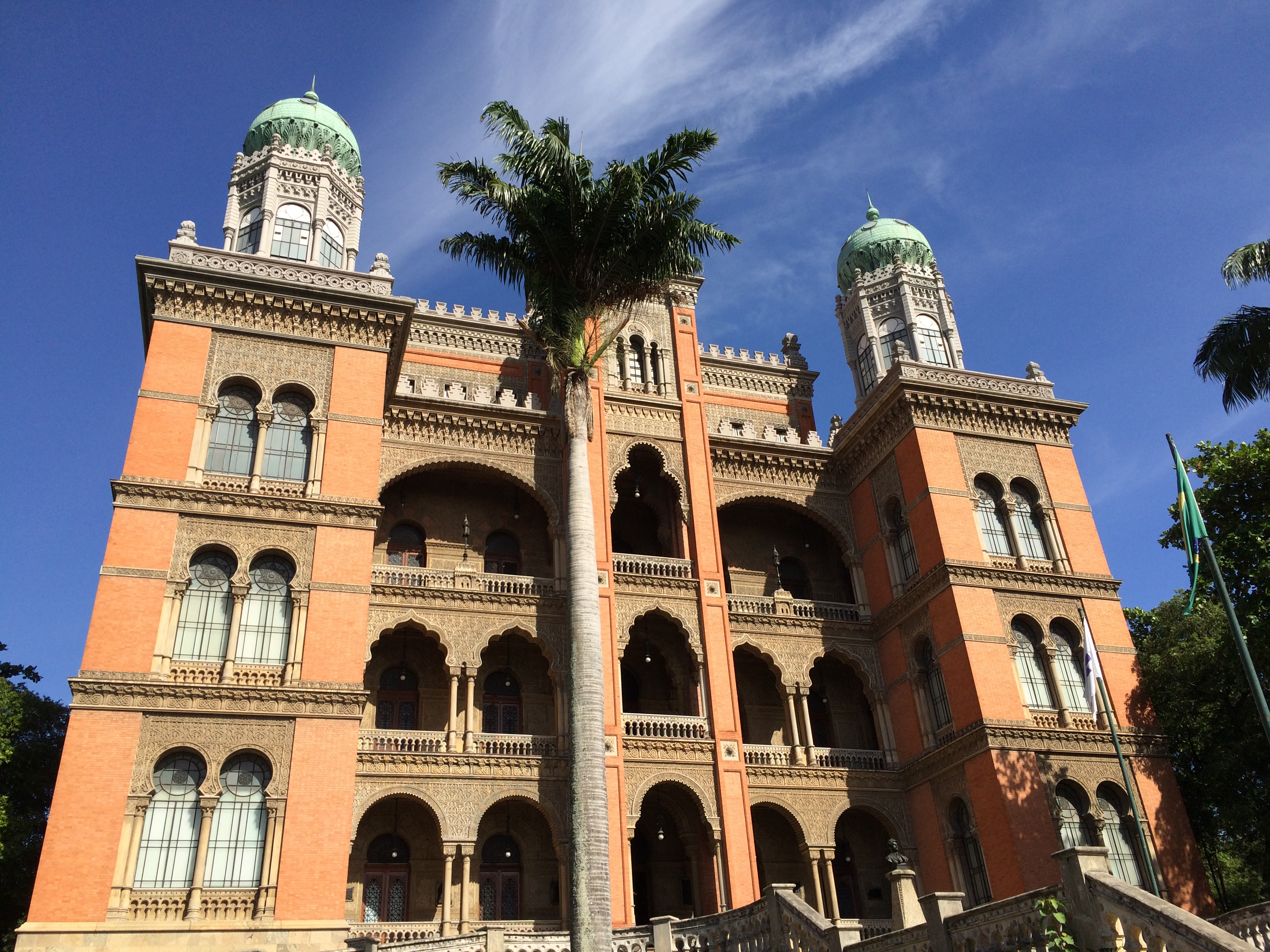
The Instituto Oswaldo Cruz, where Pereira completed a postgraduate course in 1942

The following year, he began a postgraduate course in biology at the Instituto Oswaldo Cruz. After compulsory military service, which he served in a cavalry regiment, the Dragões da Independência, Pereira returned and graduated with honors.

== Early work ==
Pereira held several part-time positions, including in clinical pathology at public and private institutions, in 1943 and 1944. He completed assistantships in microbiology under A. Monteiro Filho, and in neurology under D. Couto. Chafing at the routine, Pereira received a British Council Scholarship to study microbiology in the UK.

In England, he worked in the University of Manchester's department of microbiology under virology pioneer Hugh Bethune Maitland and bacterial taxonomist Samuel Tertius Cowan. Pereira then spent a short time at Liverpool University under Allan Watt Downie.

After eight months in Manchester, Pereira moved to London to work at the National Institute for Medical Research (NIMR) and spent a year working under Christopher Andrewes and W. J. Elford. He said about this time, "Although this period of postgraduate training did not lead to formal qualifications or published papers, it was certainly one of the most satisfactory and rewarding stages of my professional career". Pereira then became interested in laboratory research.

He married in 1946 and returned to Rio de Janeiro the following year, beginning work as a clinical pathologist at a government hospital. Pereira soon left this position to join a research team directed by J. Travassos at the Instituto Oswaldo Cruz, studying rickettsia as a part-time assistant. In contrast to his previous work in Rio de Janeiro, he described the environment as "highly stimulating". At the institute, Pereira helped demonstrate the presence of murine typhus and tick-transmitted Rocky Mountain spotted fever in the state of Rio de Janeiro. The team also developed new methods to study rickettsial antigen-antibody reactions.

== Later career ==
=== Common Cold Unit ===
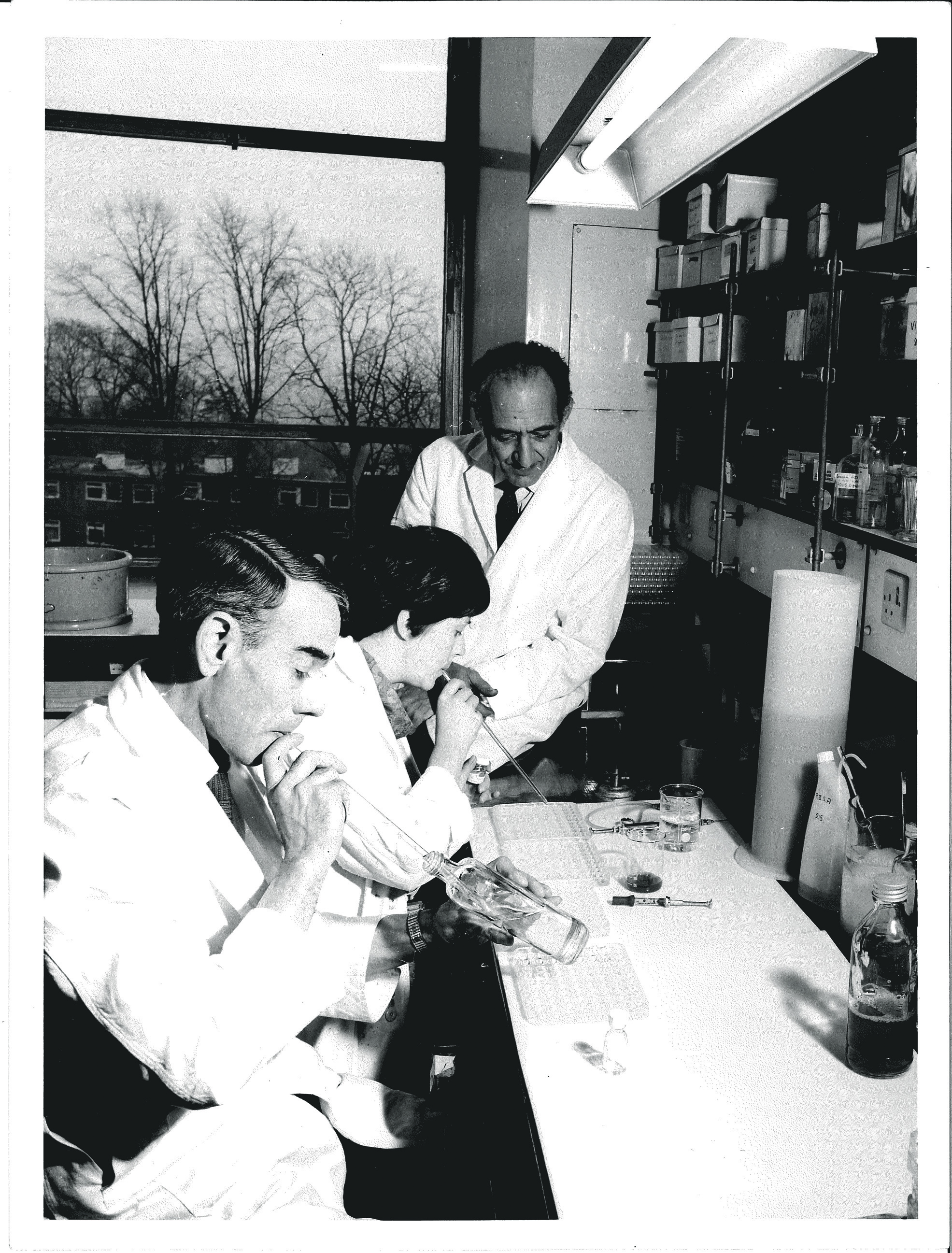
Pereira working with staff at the National Institute for Medical Research in Mill Hill

Political interference at the institute frustrated Pereira, who moved back to Britain in 1951 to work at the Medical Research Council's Common Cold Unit at Harvard Hospital in Salisbury. He worked under Christopher Andrewes, head of bacteriology and virology at the National Institute for Medical Research. The team studied the issue of culturing the common cold virus in the laboratory, and Pereira was successful at the facility. He used equipment from the institute and its library, where he often met with other scientists in his field. During a 1953 study, Pereira propagated a common-cold virus in the laboratory for the first time.

Unaware at the time of what he had achieved, he changed the direction of his work to adenoviruses. Pereira again did important work in this area, researching the reversal of the cytopathic effect of infected-cell extracts. When he was called an adenovirologist he often corrected the speaker, saying that he was an "adenovirologist type 5". Pereira spent several years working out the molecular structure of this icosahedral virus, including crystallising its subunits and producing images of the virus with electron microscopist Robin Valentine.

In 1957, he became a naturalised British subject. His wife had been working at a Salisbury hospital in a division of the Public Health Laboratory Service. Pereira accepted a post in Andrewes' laboratory, and they moved their family back to Mill Hill. His wife moved to Virus Reference Laboratory of the Central Public Health Laboratory in Colindale.

Pereira returned to Brazil in 1960 and worked at the University of Brazil, punctuating his stay with occasional visits to England. He had travelled to Italy to work with N. Nardelli and A. Rinaldi on avian influenza which was an important research interest of his for several years, leading to the demonstration of human-avian hybrid viruses and the suggestion that avian influenza could be involved in human pandemics. The importance of Pereira's work was recognised in 1961, when he became a director of the World Influenza Centre in Mill Hill at the time of the Asian flu pandemic. He was able to plot the changes in the virus using strains sent from centres around the world. The Hong Kong flu pandemic in 1968 was an opportunity to demonstrate that new identifiable strains were responsible. With his wife Peggy, who as Head of Virology at the PHLS in Colindale had responsibility for influenza surveillance in England and Wales, methods were developed to identify new strains and indicate those required for future vaccines.

=== Influenza ===
He spent three months at the Universidad de Montevideo in Uruguay in 1963, and spent time at the University of São Paulo in 1965. Pereira left the Virology department at the National Institute for Medical Research in Mill Hill in 1973 to work at the Pirbright Institute (then the Institute for Animal Health), due to increased interest in comparative virology. Using contacts from his old department, he headed the new department of epidemiology at the World Reference Laboratory for Foot and Mouth Disease. The department focused on researching exotic viral diseases and studying pathogenesis and vaccine development. Free from time-consuming administration, he enjoyed doing research there. That year, Pereira was elected a Fellow of the Royal Society. Around this time, one of his daughters died.

Pereira retired from the Pirbright Institute in 1979 and became a scientific consultant at the Instituto Oswaldo Cruz, where he worked on the AIDS virus. Pereira travelled between the UK and Brazil around this time, spending time with family in each country.

He assisted and advised young scientists about local health problems between 1979 and 1985, developing new methods and discovering new viruses with his colleagues. Pereira's wife, Peggy, organised a study of viruses which caused acute respiratory illnesses in Rio de Janeiro children at this time. They contributed to a World Health Organization meeting in Rio about the respiratory diseases programme.

== Later life ==
Shortly after Peggy retired from the Public Health Laboratory Service in 1987, she and Pereira were involved in a serious car accident in Rio de Janeiro. Peggy was killed, and he was seriously injured.

During the late 1980s, Pereira was a visiting professor for a year at the University of London's St George's Medical School. Around that time, he was a visiting fellow for a year at the Centers for Disease Control's Division of Viral and Rickettsial Diseases in Atlanta. Pereira worked with Roger Glass on characterizing unusual picobirnaviruses found in the feces of HIV patients in Brazil. He died of heart failure on August 16, 1994.

== Personal life ==
In 1946 Pereira married Marguerite "Peggy" Scott, daughter of William McDonald Scott (a senior medical officer at the UK Ministry of Health and co-founder of the Public Health Laboratory Service), and granddaughter of French Republic senator Antoine Mollard. They had one son and two daughters. Influenced by his parents, their son Raul Scott became an immunologist.

Pereira was known as a man of "infectious good nature". For the March 1994 issue of Archives of Virology, Mahy and Murphy wrote: "His legacy is grounded in his unstinting good nature - his gentleness and warmth, his smile and sense of humor, his caring nature - and his great capacity for building lifelong friendships with so many virologists working in so many disciplines. His legacy is capped off by his many scholarly contributions to science and human welfare and to the affairs of the world's virologic community".

== Honours ==
- Associate Founding Fellow of TWAS
- 1973 Fellow of the Royal Society
- 1975 Fellow of the Institute of Biology
- 1987 Carlos Findlay Prize, UNESCO

== Appointments ==
- Member, Governing Body of the Animal Virus Research Institute
- Member, Committee on Immunological Products Control
- Member, Council of the Society for General Microbiology
- Member, Executive Committee of the International Committee for the Nomenclature of Viruses
- Chairman, Vertebrate Virus Subcommittee of the International Commission for the Nomenclature of Viruses
- Vice-Chairman, International Committee for the Taxonomy of Viruses; Life Member
- Member, WHO Expert Advisory Panel on Virus Diseases
- Member, WHO Animal Virus Characterization Board
- Member, Ad Hoc Committee on Non-Oncogenic Viruses of INSERM
- Member, Scientific Advisory Committee of the Pan American Foot and Mouth Disease Center
