= Microbiology Society Prize Medal =

Microbiology award

- Awarded for: For those who have made an impact beyond microbiology and are world leaders in their field
- Presented by: Microbiology Society
- First award: 2009

Microbiology Society Prize Medal is awarded annually by the Microbiology Society to those who have made an impact beyond microbiology and are world leaders in their field.

It was introduced in 2009 as the Society for General Microbiology Prize Medal and renamed the Microbiology Society Prize Medal in 2015 when the society changed its name. All members can nominate anyone they consider appropriate for this award.

The award consists of £1000 and an invitation to give a lecture at a society meeting.

The following have been awarded this Prize:

- 2009 Stanley Prusiner prions and prion diseases
- 2010 Paul Nurse control of the cell cycle
- 2011 David Hopwood Streptomyces genomics
- 2012 Julian Davies
- 2013 Harald zur Hausen relationship between infections and cancer
- 2014 Rita Colwell disease, oceans and climate change
- 2015 David Baulcombe RNAi – the link between small RNA molecules and resistance to viruses
- 2016 Philippe Sansonetti microbiology and signalling in the digestive tract
- 2017 Michael Rossmann structural virology
- 2018 Jill Banfield impact of metagenomics on the Tree of Life and sub-surface biogeochemistry
- 2019 Jennifer Doudna discovery and developing CRISPR-Cas tools (Lecture given by Christof Fellman)
- 2020 Martin Blaser the human microbiome including Helicobacter pylori as an agent of disease in humans
- 2021 Joan Steitz RNA in bacteria and bacteriophage, small nuclear ribonucleoproteins and RNA splicing
- 2022 Bonnie Bassler Quorum sensing across domains: from viruses to bacteria to eukaryotes
- 2023 Wendy Barclay Virology, especially how the influenza, SARS-CoV-2 and other viruses may cause pandemics.
- 2024 David Holden Signature-tagged mutagenesis (STM, barcoding) for identification of mutants with altered growth in mixed populations.
