= Picornain 2A =

Protease enzyme

Identifiers
- EC no.: 3.4.22.29
- CAS no.: 103406-62-8

Databases
- IntEnz: IntEnz view
- BRENDA: BRENDA entry
- ExPASy: NiceZyme view
- KEGG: KEGG entry
- MetaCyc: metabolic pathway
- PRIAM: profile
- PDB structures: RCSB PDB PDBe PDBsum
Search
- PMC: articles
- PubMed: articles
- NCBI: proteins

Picornain 2A (EC 3.4.22.29, picornavirus endopeptidase 2A, poliovirus protease 2A, rhinovirus protease 2A, 2A protease, 2A proteinase, protease 2A, proteinase 2Apro, picornaviral 2A proteinase, Y-G proteinase 2A, poliovirus proteinase 2A, poliovirus protease 2Apro) is a protease enzyme. This enzyme catalyses selective cleavage of Tyr-Gly bond in picornavirus polyprotein.

This enzyme is coded by entero-, rhino-, aphto- and cardioviruses.
