= Harvard Hospital, Salisbury =

Hospital in Wiltshire, England

Coordinates: 51°3′12″N 1°48′8″W

Harvard Hospital was originally a field hospital at Harnham Hill, near Salisbury, Wiltshire, England. It operated for almost 50 years and had three successive uses. Its longest and final use was as the Common Cold Unit, a research facility that exposed human volunteers to viruses.

The hospital was designed and test-built in the United States as a timber "flat-pack" field hospital by Harvard Medical School. It was equipped and partly funded by the American Red Cross. Harvard Medical School built it to support the people and medical community of the United Kingdom during the war in Europe.

Both Harvard University and the American Red Cross supplied medical personnel to the United Kingdom to share their expertise in infectious diseases and to help protect the public against the spread of disease arising from the aerial bombardment of British cities. It opened in Salisbury in 1941, during the Second World War, as an infectious diseases hospital.

When the United States entered the war, the US Army requisitioned the hospital for use as both a military hospital and a blood distribution centre for US forces in Europe. When the US Army vacated the hospital at the end of the war, its joint owners, Harvard University and the American Red Cross, gave it to the UK's Ministry of Health.

From 1946 to 1989, the site housed the Common Cold Unit, a research facility of the UK Medical Research Council.

== Origins ==
=== A single American-staffed hospital ===
Harvard Hospital was built in the early 1940s and, for administrative convenience, fell under the United Kingdom's Emergency Hospital building programme run by the Ministry of Health.

Harvard Medical School was responsible for designing the hospital, transporting it to the UK as a prefabricated timber field hospital, and erecting it at a chosen site in England. Harvard Medical School brought in the American Red Cross as a partner because the organisation had more experience in fundraising and in sending volunteers to work overseas on disaster response.

By July 1941, France had fallen, and there was concern about the spread of infectious diseases arising from both the fall of France and the aerial bombardment of British cities. The hospital, with American help, was established to address that threat. It was to be the first infectious diseases hospital of its kind in the United Kingdom.

The United States was legally neutral at the time under the US Neutrality Act. Both the president of Harvard University and the dean of its medical school wished to provide direct medical assistance to the United Kingdom's medical profession.

In discussions with the UK's chief medical officer at the Ministry of Health, Harvard University offered to provide a group of experts in bacteriology, epidemiology, nutrition, sanitation, medicine and surgery. The chief medical officer was concerned that a group of American medical experts would find it difficult to fit into the English public health system, which differed greatly from the American system.

Harvard University agreed to supply the UK with a complete infectious diseases unit, fully equipped and staffed. It was to be sited near Salisbury, where there was a shortage of hospitals capable of treating patients with infectious diseases. The hospital was also to be equipped with a mobile infectious diseases field unit that could carry out field tests anywhere in the United Kingdom.

=== Design and construction ===
John E. Gordon, professor of preventive medicine at Harvard University, was placed in charge of designing the prefabricated hospital. The Ministry of Health for England and Wales was responsible for buying the land; providing access to underground services, including water, electricity and sewage; and building a central boiler house to supply heat for the centrally heated buildings supplied by the United States. In contrast to the Harvard Medical School buildings, those constructed by the Ministry of Health were to be built of brick.

By this stage of the Emergency Hospital building programme, timber was scarce and its use as a construction material was prohibited; brick, with minimal use of steel-rod reinforcements, was the preferred building material.

Harvard Hospital was assembled in 1941 at a site in Harnham, on the outskirts of Salisbury. It was laid out as a complex of twenty-two standard-size prefabricated buildings. Ten of these extended at right angles from a long central covered boardwalk and were used as hospital wards.

Six other buildings connected to the main covered boardwalk and housed support services such as laboratories, administration, laundry facilities and a central kitchen. A further six buildings, comprising two groups of three staggered buildings some distance from the main complex, served as residential accommodation for the American doctors and medical personnel assigned to operate the hospital.

=== Opening ===
The hospital was almost entirely provided by Harvard University and the American Red Cross. To comply with the Neutrality Act, the American Red Cross had overall control of the hospital. The Ministry of Health remained responsible for certain day-to-day running costs, such as maintaining the water supply, sewage disposal, electricity and heating; running the laundry; and buying and cooking food.

The hospital was scheduled to be ready to receive patients by 22 September 1941. It had fewer patient beds than other emergency hospitals built under the programme, with 125 beds across ten wards, but it had a fully equipped emergency public health laboratory to handle infectious diseases.

It also provided on-site accommodation and facilities for the American volunteer doctors, nurses and non-medical personnel, and included a decontamination unit. Later statistics showed that most of its patients were infectious troop casualties brought back from Europe, although civilian patients were also treated.

== US Army hospital and blood distribution centre ==
When the United States entered the Second World War, the Red Cross and Harvard University withdrew most of their staff. In July 1942, the hospital was handed over to the US military authorities, with Professor John E. Gordon remaining as liaison officer between the Ministry of Health and Paul Ramsey Hawley, Command Surgeon of the European Theater of Operations, United States Army.

Additional buildings were erected almost immediately to accommodate US Army technicians, provide a training school and house extra laboratories. In total, another twenty buildings were added to the original twenty-two provided by Harvard Medical School. The hospital was run by US Army personnel until the end of the war.

== Common Cold Unit ==
The final and longest use of Harvard Hospital was as the home of the Common Cold Unit, which opened at the site in 1946 and closed in 1989.

=== Transfer to the Ministry of Health ===
In 1945, after the US Army had vacated the site, the American Red Cross and Harvard Medical School presented the hospital, free of charge, to the Ministry of Health. For a short time, the Royal Pioneer Corps took charge of the site, and the centrally heated buildings were used for storage. (Note: The references used do not specify what was being stored on the site.)

The virologist Christopher Andrewes, head of the National Institute for Medical Research's Division of Bacteriology and Virus Research, was interested in using the site for common cold research by exposing human volunteers to viruses suspected of causing the disease.

=== Conversion ===
The Common Cold Unit used many of the original twenty-two buildings provided in 1941 by Harvard Medical School and the American Red Cross. Because the unit used human volunteers for testing, small groups of volunteers had to be isolated from one another and from medical staff. Volunteers were also not allowed into residential areas of Salisbury.

Many former hospital facilities were retained, particularly a first aid room, a medical examination room for the matron, an X-ray room, the laundry, central food stores and the central kitchen.

The main change was the adaptation of the six stand-alone staff accommodation buildings to house trial volunteers in semi-isolation. The unit typically needed twenty-four volunteers per ten-day test, although that number could increase for some trials.

Each of the six buildings was divided across its width into two self-contained halves, each with its own entrance porch. This provided space for twenty-four volunteers, with two people sharing each unit. The twelve porches at the ends of the flats were linked by newly constructed semi-enclosed covered boardwalks leading back to the central hospital boardwalk.

Some of the slightly newer buildings added by the US Army between 1942 and 1945, particularly the laboratories used for viral and infectious diseases research, were taken into use without modification. Ten of the specialised buildings the US Army had used for its blood distribution centre, which supplied blood for the European theatre of operations, were no longer needed and were demolished.

== Sources ==
=== Books ===
- Andrewes, Sir Christopher (1965). The Common Cold. The Advancement of Science. London: Weidenfeld & Nicolson.
- Dunn, Lieut. Colonel C. L. (1952). The Emergency Medical Services, Volume I: England and Wales. History of the Second World War: Medical Volumes. London: H.M.S.O and Longmans, Green and Co.
- Eccles, Ronald; Weber, Olaf (2009). Common Cold. Birkhauser Advances in Infectious Diseases. Basel: Birkhauser. ISBN 978-3-7643-9894-1.
- Lada, Colonel John (1976). Civil Affairs / Military Government Public Health Activities. Clinical Series: Preventative Medicine in World War II, Medical Department, United States Army. Vol. VIII. Washington, D.C.: The Historical Unit, United States Army Medical Department / U.S. Government Printing Office.
- Tyrrell, David; Michael Fielder (2002). Cold Wars: The Fight against the Common Cold. New York: Oxford University Press. ISBN 0-19-263285-X.

=== Journals, papers and newspapers ===
- Richmond, Caroline (June 2005). "Obituary: David Tyrrell". BMJ. 330 (7505): 1451. doi:10.1136/bmj.330.7505.1451. PMC 558394.

=== Websites ===
- "John Everett Gordon". London: Royal College of Physicians.
- Miller, Richard E. (3 January 2019). Kevin W. (ed.). "The American Red Cross - Harvard Field Hospital Unit (September 1939 - July 1942)". Maryland, USA: The Historical Marker Database.
- International, Hektoen (26 May 2022). "The entire hospital sent to help England in WWII - Hektoen International". hekint.org.
