= David Tyrrell (physician) =

British virologist (1925–2005)

David Tyrrell CBE FRS
- Born: David Arthur John Tyrrell; 19 June 1925; Ashford, Middlesex, England
- Died: 2 May 2005 (aged 79); Salisbury, England
- Education: University of Sheffield
- Known for: Discovery and naming of coronaviruses
- Spouse: Moyra Wylie (m. 1950)
- Children: 3 (1 son and 2 daughters)
- Scientific career
- Workplaces: Rockefeller Institute for Medical Research; Medical Research Council, Sheffield; Common Cold Unit; Northwick Park Hospital
- Doctoral students: Wendy Barclay

David Arthur John Tyrrell CBE FRS (19 June 1925 – 2 May 2005) was a British virologist who was the director of the Common Cold Unit, which investigated viruses that caused common colds. He discovered the first human coronavirus (designated B814) in 1965. With June Almeida he made the first comparative study of human and chicken coronaviruses in 1967, and invented the name coronavirus in 1968.

== Biography ==
Tyrrell was born on 19 June 1925 to Sidney Tyrrell and Agnes Kate Blewett. He had a younger brother Andrew. He attended elementary schools at Ashford, Middlesex. His family moved to Sheffield in 1940, where he completed secondary education at King Edward VII School. While studying medicine at the University of Sheffield he suffered from a detached retina, which meant he was exempted from military conscription, and had a lifelong preference for monocular microscopes. He graduated in 1948 and earned membership of the Royal College of Physicians in 1949. During those years he worked as a house physician at the Professorial Medical Unit of Sheffield Royal Hospital and at the City General Hospital in Sheffield. He was appointed as the first Research Registrar post under the Hospital Endowment Fund of Sheffield in 1950.

He moved to the Rockefeller Institute in New York to work under Frank Horsfall as an assistant from 1951 to 1954. He was briefly enrolled in the US Army during the Korean War (1950–1953). In 1954, he gained an appointment as External Scientific Staff of the Medical Research Council at the Virus Research Laboratory in Sheffield, where he worked until 1957. Upon an invitation from Sir Harold Himsworth, Secretary of MRC, he moved to the MRC's Common Cold Unit (CCU) on the outskirts of Salisbury on 1 April 1957, becoming its head from 1962 succeeding Christopher Andrewes. He was also appointed as head of the Division of Communicable Diseases in 1967 and then deputy director of the MRC's Clinical Research Centre at Northwick Park Hospital, Harrow, Middlesex, in 1970, while still attached to CCU. The Clinical Research Centre was closed in 1984 following which Tyrrell returned full time at CCU in 1985, and remained there until its official closure in 1990.

In the 1960s, after June Almeida produced the first images of the rubella virus using immune-electronmicroscopy, Tyrrell and Almeida worked on characterising a new type of viruses, now called coronaviruses.

He retired from the Common Cold Unit in 1990 and subsequently carried out research at the Centre for Applied Microbiology and Research at Porton Down, where he also worked on his scientific autobiography, Cold Wars: The Fight Against the Common Cold. He died of prostate cancer on 2 May 2005 at Salisbury.

=== Personal life ===
Tyrrell married Moyra Wylie, a general practitioner, in 1950. They had one son and two daughters. He was a devoted Christian and served as an organist and choirmaster at his local church.

== Scientific achievements ==
=== Discovery and coinage of coronavirus ===
Soon after he joined CCU, Tyrrell developed a system of categorising cold viruses. Some viruses could be maintained only in human-embryo-kidney cell culture and were designated H strain, and others could be maintained both in human-embryo-kidney cell culture and monkey-embryo-kidney cell culture and were labelled M strain. One nasal swab sample collected on 17 February 1961 from a schoolboy in Epsom, Surrey, was different as it could not be maintained in any of the culture media. The specimen designated B814 when experimented on healthy volunteers was highly contagious and produced the symptoms of cold within a few days. Due to its unusual nature, they were uncertain whether the pathogen was a virus or a bacterium. Without any other method to study, the specimen was preserved for four years. Returning from a visit to the Lund University in Sweden in 1965, Andrewes told Tyrrell that there was a young Swedish surgeon who was able to grow complex viruses. The Swede was Bertil Hoorn who had developed a culture method using human trachea tissue. Tyrrell immediately invited Hoorn to visit CCU, and after which they were able to grow different viruses which could not be cultured earlier. Specimen B814 could then be confirmed as a virus, but was unique from all known cold viruses based on its antigenic property and symptoms it produced.

Tyrrell and Malcolm L. Bynoe reported the discovery in the 5 June 1965 issue of the British Medical Journal, concluding: "After considerable initial doubts we now believe that the B814 strain is a virus virtually unrelated to any other known virus of the human respiratory tract, although, since it is ether-labile, it may be a myxovirus." This was the discovery of human coronavirus. But the virus was difficult to maintain in culture and the structure was difficult to study. In 1966, June Dalziel Almeida had just joined as an electron microscopist at the St Thomas's Hospital Medical School in London. She had earlier developed techniques for studying viruses under electron microscope, and had also studied the first two coronaviruses discovered, infectious bronchitis virus (IBV) and mouse hepatitis virus (MHV). Tyrrell sent her the specimen, including one new human virus called 229E, which was recently discovered by Dorothy Hamre and John J. Procknow at the University of Chicago. Almeida revealed that the two human viruses were identical to each other, and to IBV as well. Almeida and Tyrrell reported in the April 1967 issue of the Journal of General Virology, writing: "Probably the most interesting finding from these experiments was that two human respiratory viruses, 229 E and B814 are morphologically identical with avian infectious bronchitis."

The new discovery was supported by independent discovery of new human viruses (OC43) by Kenneth McIntosh and co-workers at the National Institute of Health, Bethesda, almost at the same time. It was becoming evident that all these viruses including MHV were of the same kind. Almeida and Tyrrell came up with the name "coronavirus". As Tyrrell recollected in Cold Wars: The Fight Against the Common Cold:

We looked more closely at the appearance of the new viruses and noticed that they had a kind of halo surrounding them. Recourse to a dictionary produced the Latin equivalent, corona, and so the name coronavirus was born.

=== Other works ===
At the Rockefeller Institute, Tyrrell worked on the epidemiology on poliomyelitis. He presented his findings at the second International Congress on Poliomyelitis in Copenhagen on 3–7 September 1951, and published in The Lancet at the end of the year. At CCU, he developed techniques for culturing different cold viruses. He was the first to grow certain cold viruses (rhinoviruses) using nasal epithelial cells. He published a series of papers on his new technique in The Lancet in 1960. With researchers from University College London, he also investigated the role of human parvovirus B19 during 1985–1987. They discovered that the virus is the causative agent of erythematous rash illness and temporary stoppage of blood formation in persons with chronic haemolytic anaemia.

== Awards and honours ==
Tyrrell was elected a Fellow of the Royal Society in 1970, and was appointed Commander of the Order of British Empire (CBE) in 1980. He held honorary degrees from the University of Sheffield (1979) and the University of Southampton (1990), and received the Stewart Prize (1977), the Ambuj Nath Bose prize (1983), and the Conway Evans Prize (1986).
