= June Almeida =

Scottish virologist (1930–2007)

June Dalziel Almeida
- Born: June Dalziel Hart; 5 October 1930; Glasgow, Scotland
- Died: 1 December 2007 (aged 77); Bexhill, England
- Known for: Pioneer of immuno-electron microscopy, identification of coronavirus, hepatitis B, HIV, rubella
- Spouses: Enriques Rosalio (Henry) Almeida (m. 1954, divorced); Phillip Samuel Gardner (m. 1982; died 1994)
- Children: 1
- Scientific career
- Fields: Virology, histopathology
- Institutions: Glasgow Royal Infirmary; St Bartholomew's Hospital; Ontario Cancer Institute; Royal Postgraduate Medical School; Wellcome Research Laboratories

June Dalziel Almeida (5 October 1930 – 1 December 2007) was a Scottish virologist, a pioneer in virus imaging and identification. Her skills in electron microscopy earned her an international reputation.

In 1964, Almeida was recruited by St Thomas's Hospital Medical School in London. By 1967, she had earned her Doctor of Science on the basis of her research and the resulting publications, while working in Canada, at Toronto's Ontario Cancer Institute and then in London at St Thomas's. she then continued her research at the Royal Postgraduate Medical School (RPGMS), which later became part of the Imperial College School of Medicine.

Almeida succeeded in identifying viruses that were previously unknown, including—in 1966—a group of viruses that was later named coronavirus, due to their crown-like appearance. Her immune electron microscopy (IEM) innovations and insights contributed to research related to the diagnosis of hepatitis B, HIV, and rubella, among other viral diseases. Her electron micrographs continue to be included in virology review textbooks, decades after she produced them.

== Early life ==
Almeida was born on 5 October 1930 at 10 Duntroon Street, Glasgow, to Jane Dalziel (née Steven) and Harry Leonard Hart, a bus driver. In 1940, her six-year-old brother died of diphtheria, perhaps leading to her interest in diseases.

In 1947, when she was 16, Almeida attended Whitehill Secondary School where she excelled academically winning the science prize. In 1947, when she was 16, she left school but was unable to attend university at that time due to financial constraints. She instead took up a position as a histopathology technician at Glasgow Royal Infirmary. She was then recruited by a former colleague, Dr John W.S. Blacklock to do similar work at St Bartholomew's Hospital. She worked at St Bartholomew's until 1954.

== Career ==
=== Ontario Cancer Institute ===
In 1954, Almeida was hired for a newly opened position as electron microscopy technician at the Ontario Cancer Institute.

While working as an electron microscopist, she and her Cancer Institute colleagues produced a series of studies applying negative staining to clinical problems.

In 1963, Almeida was the first of three authors of an article in the journal Science, in which they identified virus-like particles in cancer patients' blood. In the same year, she published her research in which she "negatively stained aggregates of antigen...and antibody" with the electron microscope. Almeida's sense of humour arose in an ode to electron microscopy, and the symmetrical structure of coronavirus (with an apology to poet, William Blake).

“Virus, virus shining bright,

In the phosphotungstic night,

What immortal hand or eye,

Dare frame thy fivefold symmetry.”

=== St Thomas's Hospital Medical School ===
In 1964, Tony Waterson, who had just been appointed as chair of microbiology at St Thomas's, met Almeida while visiting Toronto, and recruited her to join his research team at one of the oldest and most prestigious medical schools in the United Kingdom—London's St Thomas's Hospital Medical School, now part of King's College London. At St Thomas's, she worked on hepatitis B virus and the cold viruses.

In 1966, Waterson and Almeida collaborated with the physician and director of research on the common cold, David Tyrrell, who was working on a new organ culture system. Tyrrell's team had been attempting to detect the presence of rhinoviruses in tissue cultures of cells that they had produced in the lab. They wanted to detect a specific respiratory virus they called B814. The Swedish professor Bertil Hoorn could make all Tyrrell's respiratory viruses in organ cultures of cells from the human airway in the laboratory, except for virus B814. This organ culture system meant they did not have to depend on human volunteers to do research on these viruses. They wanted a reliable method to detect virus B814.

By 1967, Almeida earned her Doctor of Science (DSc) based on her publications on electron micrographic research of antibodies conducted at the Ontario Cancer Institute and at St Thomas's.

In the book Cold Wars (2002), which Tyrrell wrote with Michael Fielder, he described how when he first met Almeida she seemed to be extending the range of the electron microscope to new limits.

According to Tyrrell, prior to her innovative work, it was generally accepted that viruses had to be concentrated and purified to detect them with the electron microscope. When she told Tyrrell that she could "find virus particles" in the organ cultures that they had collected, with her "new, improved techniques", he was skeptical.

Tyrrell's team sent samples to Almeida in London. These included a sample prepared with the B814 virus, along with samples infected with influenza and herpes, which were well known. When she examined the samples through her microscope grids, "she recognized all the known viruses, and her pictures revealed their structure beautifully. But more importantly, she also saw virus particles in the B814 sample." she told Tyrrell that the B814 specimens had reminded her of particles she had previously studied in a "disease called infectious bronchitis of chickens" and in another disease—"mouse hepatitis liver inflammation." Almeida's papers on these had been rejected because the referees considered her electron micrographs to be "bad pictures" of known influenza virus particles. Almeida told him she now knew that these "three viruses were something quite new."

According to Tyrrell, once Almeida had identified the previously unrecognised group of viruses, they met in Waterson's office, to decide on its name. The viruses appeared to be surrounded by a "halo", which in Latin is "corona", and the name "coronavirus" was born.

In 1966, she and Tyrrell wrote that "The particles are pleomorphic, in the size range 800 to 1200 Å, and are surrounded by a distinct 200 Å long fringe. They are indistinguishable from the particles of avian infectious bronchitis, the only virus previously known to have this morphology."

=== Royal Postgraduate Medical School of London (RPGMS) ===
In 1968, Almeida published an article in Journal of General Virology, on "avian infectious bronchitis virus".

In 1971, using her immune electronmicroscopy technique, Almeida made the landmark discovery that the hepatitis B virus had "two immunologically distinct components"—an "outer coat and a small inner component".

=== Wellcome Institute ===
Almeida spent her final years of her professional career at the Wellcome Institute before she retired. While working for the Institute she was named on several patents in the field of imaging viruses.

=== Major contributions ===
In their 2013 book entitled To Catch a Virus, John Booss and Marilyn J. August describe how Almeida "played a crucial role in adapting the electron microscope to clinical diagnostic virology work." (Note: In the chapter entitled "Imaging viruses and tagging their antigens" in John Booss and Marilyn J. August's 2013 To Catch a Virus, they describe the how "refinements in electron microscopy (EM)...greatly expanded the understanding of the structure and replication of viruses and facilitated the application of EM to viral diagnosis. The refinements included thin sectioning, negative staining, and immunoelectron microscopy (IEM) developed for clinical diagnostic work. The use of EM in discovering the viral causes of acute gastroenteritis and infectious hepatitis are then considered." ASM: "This chapter first examines the refinements in electron microscopy (EM) that greatly expanded the understanding of the structure and replication of viruses and facilitated the application of EM to viral diagnosis. The refinements included thin sectioning, negative staining, and immunoelectron microscopy (IEM) developed for clinical diagnostic work. The use of EM in discovering the viral causes of acute gastroenteritis and infectious hepatitis are then considered.")

Before Almeida's work with Anthony Peter Waterson in the 1960s, few improvements had been made on the initial 1941 "proof of principle aggregation of virus by virus-specific antibody observable by [electron microscope (EI)]." In 1963, she pioneered a technique in immune electron microscopy (IEM), to better visualise viruses by using antibodies to aggregate them. In the 1960s, she and Waterson were using negative staining for the EM of viruses—a technique that was both rapid and simple—and provided excellent detailed observations of viral morphology, which had revolutionized the electron microscopy of viruses overnight.

In 1966, using her new techniques, Almeida was able to identify a group of "previously uncharacterised human respiratory viruses", while collaborating with David Tyrrell, then director of the Common Cold Research Centre in Salisbury in Wiltshire. Tyrrell suggested calling the new group "coronaviruses". The coronavirus family of viruses now includes the SARS virus and the SARS-CoV2 virus that causes Coronavirus disease 2019.

In 1967, using the IEM aggregation method, Almeida produced the first visualisation of rubella virus.

== In retirement ==
After taking early retirement from Wellcome Institute, Almeida returned in an advisory role to St Thomas's. In the late 1980s she helped produce micrographs of the HIV virus, where University of Aberdeen professor of bacteriology Hugh Pennington was also then attached.

Almeida's publications include the 1979 Manual for rapid laboratory viral diagnosis for the World Health Organization.

Almeida trained as a yoga teacher and became involved in her second husband Philip Gardner's antique business.

== Legacy ==
In 1970, at the Royal Postgraduate Medical School (RPGMS) Almeida taught Albert Kapikian the technique of immune electron microscopy (IEM). Kapikian, who was visiting for six months from the United States National Institutes of Health, used her techniques in the identification of a cause of non-bacterial gastroenteritis—the Norwalk virus, now known as the Norovirus.

Almeida's work received new attention during the early months of the COVID-19 pandemic. Her little-known story was first published by the Herald in Scotland on 7 March 2020, the BBC on 15 April 2020 the National Geographic on April 17, 2020, and later her research noted in The National on 19 May 2020. According to professor of bacteriology Hugh Pennington, Chinese scientists credited Almeida's work, including techniques she developed, with the early identification of coronavirus disease 2019.

In 2025, an exhibition on the international endeavour to develop a COVID-19 vaccine opened at the National Museum of Scotland, called Injecting Hope: The Race For A Covid-19 Vaccine showing the scientific principles and innovative research behind the urgent development of a vaccine and the global logistical challenges it faced. Almeida's original work underpinning the theory behind later research, is marked with her notebooks on exhibit.

== Personal life ==
On 11 December 1954 Almeida married Enrique Rosalio (Henry) Almeida (1913–1993), a Venezuelan artist. Together they had a daughter Joyce who became a psychiatrist and had two daughters.

In 1985, Almeida retired to Bexhill-on-Sea with her second husband, Phillip Samuel Gardner, a fellow virologist, whom she had married in 1979. Gardner died in 1994.

In 2007, Almeida died of a heart attack at Bexhill.

== Commemoration ==
In September 2020, a new COVID-19 testing laboratory at Guy's Hospital was named after Almeida.

== See also ==
- COVID-19 – Contagious disease caused by SARS-CoV-2
- Timeline of women in science
