= William Paul Duprex =

Microbiologist

Paul Duprex
- Born: William Paul Duprex; 1968 (age 57–58); Lurgan, Northern Ireland
- Other name: Paul Duprex
- Citizenship: British; Irish
- Occupation: Scientist

Academic background
- Education: The Queens University of Belfast (PhD); The Queens University of Belfast (BSc)
- Doctoral advisor: Bert Rima

Academic work
- Discipline: Vaccines, emerging diseases, infections
- Institutions: University of Pittsburgh
- Website: http://www.cvr.pitt.edu

William Paul Duprex (pronounced /djuːˈpreɪ/ dew-PRAY; born 1968) is a British scientist and advocate for vaccines and global health. He serves as director of the University of Pittsburgh's Center for Vaccine Research and Regional Biocontainment Laboratory. Duprex holds the Jonas Salk Chair in Vaccine Research. He is also a professor of microbiology and molecular genetics at the University of Pittsburgh School of Medicine and serves as editor-in-chief of the Journal of General Virology, which is published by the Microbiology Society, and a senior editor of mSphere, published by the American Society for Microbiology. Duprex is an expert in measles and mumps viruses and studies viral spillover from animals to humans, including the SARS-CoV-2 virus that caused the COVID-19 pandemic. Duprex is a Fellow of the American Academy of Microbiology.

== Early life and education ==
Duprex, who goes by his middle name, Paul, was born to a Protestant family in Lurgan, Northern Ireland, during the violent political conflict known as The Troubles. He attended King's Park Primary School, Lurgan College, and Queen's University Belfast (QUB), where he earned a BS in biochemistry and genetics in 1990 and a PhD in molecular virology in 1995.

As a boy at King's Park Primary, he first discovered a love of science while observing tadpoles transform into frogs. Later, at Lurgan College, he discovered microbiology, experimenting with his classmates' saliva to determine which toothpaste was the best at killing the bacteria that colonize the mouth.

== Career ==
=== Early career ===
Duprex stayed on at QUB as a postdoctoral research fellow from 1995 to 1999, studying how measles virus infects the brain, and served as a lecturer in molecular virology and biochemistry from 1999 to 2010, during which time he studied measles, mumps, canine distemper, and foot-and-mouth disease virus in biocontainment at the Pirbright Institute.

=== Emerging infectious diseases, zoonosis, and vaccine development ===
From 2006 to 2007, Duprex worked at Johnson & Johnson as a principal scientist and head of the Department of Emerging Sciences and Technologies, working to create heat-stable vaccines that are more suitable for distributing throughout the developing world. Duprex moved to Boston University in 2010 to take the positions of associate professor of microbiology and director of cell and tissue imaging in the National Emerging Infectious Diseases Laboratories, where he trained to use "space-suit-virology" in a BSL-4 lab to understand pathogenesis in paramyxoviruses such as measles, mumps, and respiratory syncytial virus in humans, as well as Hendra virus in horses and Newcastle disease virus in chickens. During this time, he won funding from the Bill & Melinda Gates Foundation Grand Challenges in Global Health to continue his work with heat-stable measles vaccines. In 2018, Duprex became director of the Center for Vaccine Research at the University of Pittsburgh, where he continues to study the evolution of human and animal respiratory viruses such as measles, mumps and SARS-CoV-2, with the practical goals of developing new vaccines for emerging diseases as well as tools that predict viral spillover from animal reservoirs into humans.

=== COVID-19 response ===
Since the start of the COVID-19 pandemic, Duprex has used his public profile on Twitter to share information about the virus and promote vaccination, which he had been outspoken about prior to the pandemic. Since COVID-19 emerged, Duprex has appeared as a subject matter expert in television, radio, and print news outlets. Duprex's team began working with live SARS-CoV-2 virus in February 2020, immediately helping to validate a PCR-based COVID-19 test developed by the University of Pittsburgh Medical Center (UPMC). In April 2020, Duprex secured one of the first Coalition for Epidemic Preparedness Innovation (CEPI) grants funding the creation of a COVID-19 vaccine, together with partners at the Pasteur Institute in Paris and Themis Bioscience in Austria. This particular vaccine was designed to use a recombinant measles vaccine as a vector for introducing SARS-CoV-2 spike protein into the body. Merck acquired Themis in June 2020 and abandoned all COVID-19 vaccine research in January 2021. Since then, Duprex's team has been focused on understanding how the SARS-CoV-2 virus mutates to create new viral variants, including Delta and Omicron, which the World Health Organization declared variants of concern. With collaborators at Carnegie Mellon University, he is working on improving vaccine delivery systems that can more safely and effectively reach remote parts of the developing world.

== Selected publications ==
- Intractable Coronavirus Disease 2019 (COVID-19) and Prolonged Severe Acute Respiratory Syndrome Coronavirus 2 (SARS-CoV-2) Replication in a Chimeric Antigen Receptor-Modified T-Cell Therapy Recipient: A Case Study (2021). Clin Infect Dis., 73(3): e815–e821.
- Inhalable Nanobody (PiN-21) prevents and treats SARS-CoV-2 infections in Syrian hamsters at ultra-low doses (2021). Science Advances, 7 (22), eabh0319.
- Versatile and multivalent nanobodies efficiently neutralize SARS-CoV-2 (2020). Science, 370 (6523), 1479–1484.
- Animal models for COVID-19 (2020). Nature, 586:509-515. PMID 32967005.
- Persistence of severe acute respiratory syndrome coronavirus 2 in aerosol suspensions (2020). Emerging infectious diseases, 26 (9), 2168.
- Needle-free delivery of measles virus vaccine to the lower respiratory tract of non-human primates elicits optimal immunity and protection (2017). Nature Vaccines, 2 (1), 1–11.
- Recent mumps outbreaks in vaccinated populations: no evidence of immune escape (2012). Journal of virology, 86 (1), 615-620 103 2012.
- Early target cells of measles virus after aerosol infection of non-human primates (2011). PLoS pathogens, 7 (1), e1001263.
- Ligand-induced conformational changes allosterically activate Toll-like receptor 9 (2007). Nature immunology, 8 (7), 772–779.
- Predominant Infection of CD150+ Lymphocytes and Dendritic Cells during Measles Virus Infection of Macaques (2007). PLoS pathogens, 3 (11), e178.
- Hemagglutinin protein of wild-type measles virus activates toll-like receptor 2 signaling (2002). Journal of virology, 76 (17), 8729–8736.
- Observation of measles virus cell-to-cell spread in astrocytoma cells by using a green fluorescent protein-expressing recombinant virus (1999). Journal of virology, 73 (11), 9568–9575.

== Awards and honors ==
- 2013 - Gardner Prize Lectureship, European Society for Clinical Virology
- 2018 - Fellow of the American Academy of Microbiology
- 2021 - Carnegie Science Awards (25th Year): Chairman's Award
