= Saffold virus =

Virus classification
- (unranked): Virus
- Realm: Riboviria
- Kingdom: Orthornavirae
- Phylum: Pisuviricota
- Class: Pisoniviricetes
- Order: Picornavirales
- Family: Picornaviridae
- Genus: Cardiovirus
- Species: Cardiovirus saffoldi

Species of virus

Saffold virus (SAFV) is a single-stranded RNA human virus belonging to the family Picornaviridae. Discovered in 2007, it is the first human virus in the genus Cardiovirus and may provide a link to the development of multiple sclerosis or other serious diseases in humans.

Saffold virus has shown to affect the gastrointestinal tract and respiratory systems, and is found to be present early in life.

== Discovery ==
SAFV was discovered by Morris S. Jones in 2007 while working at the David Grant USAF Medical Center in the United States. The virus was isolated from a stool sample taken in November 1981 from an 8-month-old female with fever of unknown origin.

This is the first human virus in the genus Cardiovirus. Found to occur in high prevalence (>90%) among humans, by analogy SAFV may have effects similar to those observed in mouse TMEV-induced encephalomyelitis, in terms of catalyzing the development of human multiple sclerosis or other serious diseases following infection early in life.

== Strains ==
Eights strains of SAFV have been identified; these are named SAFV-1 through SAFV-8. Of these strains, SAFV-1 has a global distribution. The other strains have only been isolated from specific locations.

== Structure ==
SAFV is composed of 8050 nucleotide long single-stranded RNA, and in diameter is 30 nm long icosahedral shaped capsid. Contained on both the 3' and 5' ends of the strand are untranslated regions (UTR) with the 5' UTR side being 1040 nucleotides (nt) long and the 3' side being 120 nt long. A poly(A) is located on the 3'UTR side, and contained on the 5'UTR side are internal ribosome entry sites (IRES).
