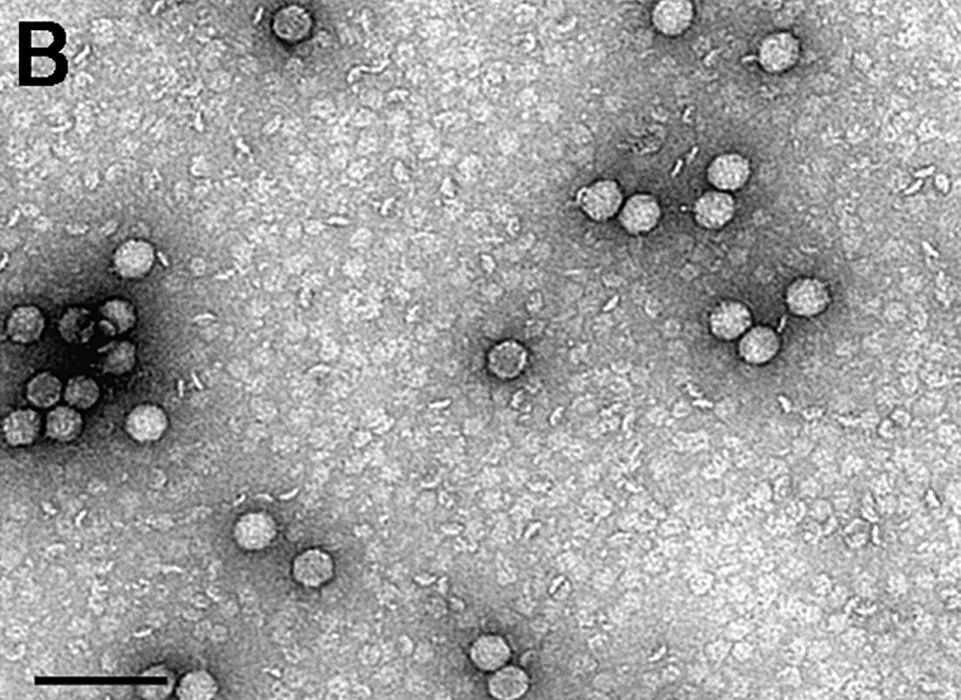
- TEM micrograph of Encephalomyocarditis virus virions bar scale equals 100 nm

Virus classification
- (unranked): Virus
- Realm: Riboviria
- Kingdom: Orthornavirae
- Phylum: Pisuviricota
- Class: Pisoniviricetes
- Order: Picornavirales
- Family: Picornaviridae
- Genus: Cardiovirus
- Species: Cardiovirus rueckerti

Synonyms
- Cardiovirus A

= Encephalomyocarditis virus =

Species of virus

Encephalomyocarditis virus (EMCV) is a member of the Picornaviridae family, and Cardiovirus genus. EMCV is small, non-enveloped, icosahedric, and contains positive sense single-stranded RNA. Infection with the virus causes encephalomyocarditis, myocarditis, encephalitis, and reproductive and neurological disease in a variety of mammal species. Because of this, EMCV is commonly used as a model for myocarditis and other immunological studies. Although a variety of mammals may host the virus, pigs are classed as the domestic host as they are most easily infected, and it is thought to be spread by rodents. Another potential vector is through bats, after the EMCV genome was found widely in fecal guanos East Asia. This raises concern in potential research on pig heart transplants to humans, highlighting need for further investigation.

== History ==
The disease can be found worldwide but is of greatest economic importance in tropical areas. EMCV was first found in Miami, Fl from a male gibbon with myocarditis and pulmonary edema. EMCV was isolated from the mice inoculated with edema fluid from the gibbon, which resulted in death in the mice from myocarditis as well as paralysis.

== Infection ==
The RNA of EMCV is infectious, and introduction into the cells is enough for the virus to begin replication. To enter the cell, the virus attaches to the membrane receptor, normally a sialoglycoprotein with non-specific binding properties. The main binding receptor however remains unknown. After binding, the RNA is uncoated and released into the cytoplasm of the host cell. The mRNA of EMCV contains two untranslated regions surrounding the coding region, two open reading frames (ORF) and a poly(C) tail that is specific to aphtoviruses and EMCV. At the end of the first untranslated region, there is the internal ribosome entry site (IRES), which is a highly ordered structure of hairpin loops. This allows ribosome binding, kickstarting translation of the ORF. Translation is now initiated at the IRES and the polyprotein is developed.

The RNA encodes one large polyprotein, that can be cleaved in various ways to create thirteen mature proteins. These proteins have different roles, including formation of membrane vesicles and assist in replication of virus for further infection. Once virions are fully formed, they are lysed from the host cell to repeat the infection process. This lysis causes necrotic cell death.

The virus primarily through the intestinal Peyer's patches, replicating in the macrophages found at that entry site. From there, the virus is dispersed into through the lymphathic system into the circulatory system. This allows it to act on the myocardium of the cardiac system and lead to heart failure.

== Clinical signs and diagnosis ==
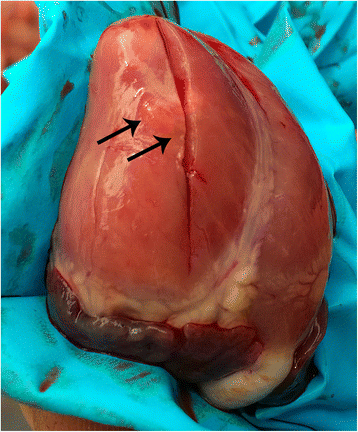
Heart of a piglet. Shows an EMCV lesion, with arrows pointing to necrosis of the myocardium.

EMCV has been isolated from a variety of wild and domestic animals from various parts of the world, indicating that it has reach worldwide and can infect many different species. Rodents are thought to be the primary transmission organism, due to the asymptomatic infection, efficient viral replication, and availability of rodents in many farms. Rats survive infective EMCV doses that would kill pigs. The virus can spread through water or food infected by feces or carcasses of diseased rats or through horizontal transmission from pig to pig or rat to rat. Rates of viral infection rise in cold months, which could be due to rodents remaining indoors due to the cold. The stability and resistance of the EMCV makes it difficult to treat farm food sources, allowing for easy transmission to farm animals, specifically pigs.

Piglets that are infected present with encephalitis, myocarditis, and cardiac failure leading to sudden death. Mortality rates can be high. If a sow is infected whilst pregnant she may present with a variety of reproductive signs including infertility, mummification, abortion, still birth and the birth of weak piglets, but does not usually show normal clinical signs of illness. The first signs of EMCV infection in sows is the occurrence of sudden death in weaners. A variety of gastrointestinal, respiratory and systemic signs may also be seen as the virus infects multiple body systems. Lesions in the myocardium, mostly seen in the right ventricle, are most common. These lesions are caused by necrosis of the sarcoplasm from the virus infection.

A presumptive diagnosis can be made based on the history and clinical signs. Virus isolation from fetuses, infected tissue, or feces and inoculation into cell culture is necessary for definitive diagnosis. Virus identification and serological tests must then be run on the cultures inoculated to verify identity. Postmortem examination of piglets may or may not reveal cardiac pathology but histopathology should show cardiac and brain abnormalities. Signs in aborted fetuses are highly variable.

Other animals have the ability to contract EMCV, normally through the same rodent vector that infects pigs, though not at the same rates as pigs. In 1993, there was an outbreak in Kruger National Park among the elephants, which resulted in 64 dead. The virus was isolated from one elephant upon death after a period of vomiting, colic, and diarrhea. EMCV also has an impact on the nonhuman primates, leaving them highly susceptible to the virus. The symptoms shown vary between species, with most observing a rapid death due to the virus.

=== Zoonotic potential ===
While most common in animal species, and while there has been some cross over of EMCV into humans, clinical disease is rare. The risk of exposure is high for humans, but limited myocarditis recorded. There are many cases found in humans, but symptoms seldom show, with many being asymptomatic.

== Treatment ==
There is currently no treatment available against infection by EMCV, and is difficult due to rapid progression of the disease. Some treatments that have been attempted, but failed include treatment with amoxicillin-clavulanic acid and meloxicam. This helped alleviate symptoms slightly, but the animal died in the end. There are treatments however that are reported, however, more research is required to create a comprehensive treatment. One includes injecting Yellow baboons with the virus twice daily, and all treatment schedules succeeded in preventing death.

In outbreaks, preventing stress in the pigs can limit mortality rates as well as Vitamin E and Se supplementations. The purpose is to assist with heart health and hopefully lessen the impact of EMCV. Better cleaning and disinfection protocols are effective in prevention of EMCV. While many attempts at a vaccine have been done, none were a complete success.

Research has been done on Gallic acid (GA) as a treatment option for EMCV, finding that the organic acid has some antiviral properties and impose an inhibitory effect on EMCV. To test these properties, GA was applied at different timepoints to cell samples, before and after infection. Results showed that GA could inhibit copies of EMCV genomes when applied pre-treatment before EMCV infection, as well as when it was applied post-treatment after EMCV infection.
