= Signature-tagged mutagenesis =

Genetic technique to create random mutants

Signature-tagged mutagenesis (STM) is a genetic technique used to study gene function. Recent advances in genome sequencing have allowed us to catalogue a large variety of organisms' genomes, but the function of the genes they contain is still largely unknown. Using STM, the function of the product of a particular gene can be inferred by disabling it and observing the effect on the organism. The original and most common use of STM is to discover which genes in a pathogen are involved in virulence in its host, to aid the development of new medical therapies/drugs.

== Basic premise ==
The gene in question is inactivated by insertional mutation; a transposon is used which inserts itself into the gene sequence. When that gene is transcribed and translated into a protein, the insertion of the transposon affects the protein structure and (in theory) prevents it from functioning. In STM, mutants are created by random transposon insertion and each transposon contains a different 'tag' sequence that uniquely identifies it. If an insertional mutant bacterium exhibits a phenotype of interest, such as susceptibility to an antibiotic it was previously resistant to, its genome can be sequenced and searched (using a computer) for any of the tags used in the experiment. When a tag is located, the gene that it disrupts is also thus located (it will reside somewhere between a start and stop codon which mark the boundaries of the gene).

STM can be used to discover which genes are critical to a pathogen's virulence by injecting a 'pool' of different random mutants into an animal model (e.g. a mouse infection model) and observing which of the mutants survive and proliferate in the host. Those mutant pathogens that don't survive in the host must have an inactivated gene, required for virulence. Hence, this is an example of a negative selection method.
