= Max Theiler =

South African-American virologist and physician

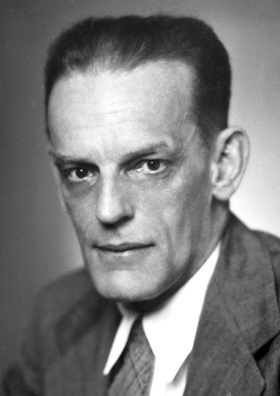
- Theiler in 1951
- Born: 30 January 1899; Pretoria, South African Republic (present-day South Africa)
- Died: 11 August 1972 (aged 73); New Haven, Connecticut, U.S.
- Education: University of Cape Town
- Known for: Developing a vaccine against yellow fever
- Awards: Chalmers Medal (1939); Lasker-DeBakey Clinical Medical Research Award (1949); Nobel Prize in Physiology or Medicine (1951)
- Scientific career
- Fields: Virology

Max Theiler (30 January 1899 – 11 August 1972) was a South African-American virologist and physician. He was awarded the Nobel Prize in Physiology or Medicine in 1951 for developing a vaccine against yellow fever in 1937, becoming the first African-born Nobel laureate.

Born in Pretoria, Theiler was educated in South Africa through completion of his degree in medical school. He went to London for postgraduate work at St Thomas's Hospital Medical School and at the London School of Hygiene and Tropical Medicine, earning a 1922 diploma in tropical medicine and hygiene. That year, he moved to the United States to do research at the Harvard University School of Tropical Medicine. He lived and worked in that nation the rest of his life. In 1930, he moved to the Rockefeller Foundation in New York, becoming director of the Virus Laboratory.

== Early life and education ==
Theiler was born in Pretoria, the capital of the South African Republic (now South Africa); his father Arnold Theiler was a veterinary bacteriologist. He attended Pretoria Boys High School, Rhodes University College, and University of Cape Town Medical School, graduating in 1918. He left South Africa for London to study at St Thomas's Hospital Medical School, King's College London, and at the London School of Hygiene and Tropical Medicine. In 1922, he was awarded a diploma in tropical medicine and hygiene; he became a licentiate of the Royal College of Physicians of London and a member of the Royal College of Surgeons of England.

== Career development ==
Theiler wanted to pursue a career in research, so in 1922, he took a position at the Harvard University School of Tropical Medicine in Cambridge, Massachusetts. He spent several years investigating amoebic dysentery and trying to develop a vaccine for rat-bite fever.

After becoming assistant to Andrew Sellards, he started working on yellow fever. In 1926, they disproved Hideyo Noguchi's hypothesis that yellow fever was caused by the bacterium Leptospira icteroides. In 1928, the year after the disease was identified conclusively as being caused by a virus, they showed that the African and South American viruses are immunologically identical. (This followed Adrian Stokes' inducing yellow fever in rhesus macaques from India). In the course of this research, Theiler contracted yellow fever, but survived and developed immunity.

In 1930, Theiler moved to the Rockefeller Foundation in New York, where he later became director of the Virus Laboratory. He was professor of epidemiology and public health at the Yale School of Medicine and the School of Public Health from 1964 to 1967.

== Work on yellow fever ==
After passing the yellow fever virus through laboratory mice, Theiler found that the weakened virus conferred immunity on rhesus macaques. The stage was set for Theiler to develop a vaccine against the disease. Theiler first devised a test for the efficacy of experimental vaccines. In his test, sera from vaccinated human subjects were injected into mice to see if they protected the mice against yellow fever virus. This "mouse protection test" was used with variations as a measure of immunity until after World War II. Subculturing the particularly virulent Asibi strain from West Africa in chicken embryos, a technique pioneered by Ernest Goodpasture, the Rockefeller team sought to obtain an attenuated strain of the virus that would not kill mice when injected into their brains. It took until 1937, and more than 100 subcultures in chicken embryos, for Theiler and his colleague Hugh Smith to obtain an attenuated strain, which they named "17D". Animal tests showed the attenuated 17D mutant was safe and immunizing. Theiler's team rapidly completed the development of a 17D vaccine, and the Rockefeller Foundation began human trials in South America. Between 1940 and 1947, the Rockefeller Foundation produced more than 28 million doses of the vaccine and finally ended yellow fever as a major disease.

For this work, Theiler received the 1951 Nobel Prize in Physiology or Medicine. Theiler also was awarded the Royal Society of Tropical Medicine and Hygiene's Chalmers Medal in 1939, Harvard University's Flattery Medal in 1945, and the American Public Health Association's Lasker Award in 1949.

== Theiler's murine encephalomyelitis virus ==
In 1937, Max Theiler discovered a filterable agent that was a known cause for paralysis in mice. He found the virus was not transmittable to rhesus macaques (rhesus monkey, a species of Old World Monkey) and that only some mice developed symptoms. The virus is now referred to as Theiler's murine encephalomyelitis virus. The virus has been well characterized, and now serves as a standard model for studying multiple sclerosis.

== Private life ==
He married Lillian Graham (1895–1977) in 1928, and they had one daughter. He died on 11 August 1972 in New Haven, Connecticut.

== Publications ==
Max Theiler contributed to three books:

- Viral and Rickettsial Infections of Man (1948)
- Yellow Fever (1951)
- The Arthropod-Borne Viruses of Vertebrates: An Account of The Rockefeller Foundation Virus Program, 1951–1970, Max Theiler and W. G. Downs. (1973) Yale University Press. New Haven and London. ISBN 0-300-01508-9.

Theiler wrote numerous papers, published in The American Journal of Tropical Medicine and Annals of Tropical Medicine and Parasitology.
