= Theiler's murine encephalomyelitis virus =

Virus classification
- (unranked): Virus
- Realm: Riboviria
- Kingdom: Orthornavirae
- Phylum: Pisuviricota
- Class: Pisoniviricetes
- Order: Picornavirales
- Family: Picornaviridae
- Genus: Cardiovirus
- Species: Cardiovirus theileri
- Virus: Theiler's murine encephalomyelitis virus

Species of virus

Theiler's murine encephalomyelitis virus (TMEV) is a single-stranded RNA murine cardiovirus from the family Picornaviridae. It has been used as a mouse model for studying virally induced paralysis, as well as encephalomyelitis comparable to multiple sclerosis. Depending on the mouse and viral strain, viral pathogenesis can range from negligible, to chronic or acute encephalomyelitis.

== Discovery ==
The virus was discovered by virologist Max Theiler in 1937 while working at the Rockefeller Institute. Theiler discovered the encephalomyelitis virus during research on poliovirus-like paralysis symptoms in mice. That year Theiler had completed work on developing a vaccine for yellow fever, for which he is best known; in 1951 he received the Nobel Prize for that achievement.

== Strains ==
The several different strains of TMEV are characterized by their pathology as well as genetic sequencing and proteomics. The two major groups are listed below; there are several other strains in the same group as DA (such as BeAn).

=== GDVII ===
TMEV GDVII virus is characterized by acute encephalomyelitis in susceptible mice, with a high mortality rate and no viral persistence after viral clearance by the immune system. No demyelination occurs in surviving mice. The GDVII L protein is specific in that it down-regulates the anti-viral response by inhibition of Interferon Regulatory Factor 3 (IRF3) after it is activated by hyperphosphorylation, but before it is able to enhance Interferon-β transcription by binding to the gene's promoter.

=== DA ===
The TMEV DA strain, in contrast, is characterized by chronic encephalomyelitis in susceptible mice. Infection initiates in astrocytes and microglia, but persists in macrophages. This strain has been used as an acceptable model for human multiple sclerosis. and epilepsy. The DA strain has also been shown to inhibit IRF-3 phosphorylation, by inhibiting an unknown intermediate step after RIG-I/MDA5 activation of IKKε and TBK1 kinases. The L protein has been shown to be critical in this process, although the mechanism is unknown. The DA strain of TMEV also encodes for a L* protein that is likely involved in viral persistence in macrophages. This protein's influence on the murine immune system, therefore, could be beneficial in understanding immune-mediated demyelination in diseases such as multiple sclerosis.

== Analogies with multiple sclerosis/pathology ==
Multiple sclerosis is a chronic disease that results in demyelination of the axons in brain and spinal cord, which often leads to severe neurological problems and eventually paralysis. The symptoms of MS are largely immune mediated, but the mechanism of the immune system's initiation in this disease is unknown. It is likely that both genetic and environmental factors play a large role in the initiation and progression of the disease. There are a number of animal models for MS. A common one is known as Experimental autoimmune encephalomyelitis, while TMEV occurs via injection of TMEV, and is thus distinct from EAE.

One hypothesis for the initiation is that an infection stimulates the innate immune system, specifically perivascular microglia. This allows the entrance of T-cells, and microglia spread viral epitopes, along with myelin epitopes, to T cells, which then are activated to "attack" the myelin cells. This is the proposed course of disease in TMEV infection in mice.

Many bacteria and viruses infect humans without pathology in normal individuals. If certain individuals are genetically predisposed to immunological intolerance of these commensal organisms, pathology can occur. The Saffold virus, a human virus discovered in 2007, has been shown to have high prevalence in humans (>90%). It may be an important link between the study of mouse TMEV-induced encephalomyelitis and human multiple sclerosis.

The majority of mouse strains are not susceptible to the pathology associated with TMEV infection. As SJL/J mice are notoriously susceptible, the majority of studies exploring factors that could lead to MS utilize this strain. Max Theiler also used the SJL/J strain to study the progression of a polio-like disease in mice.
