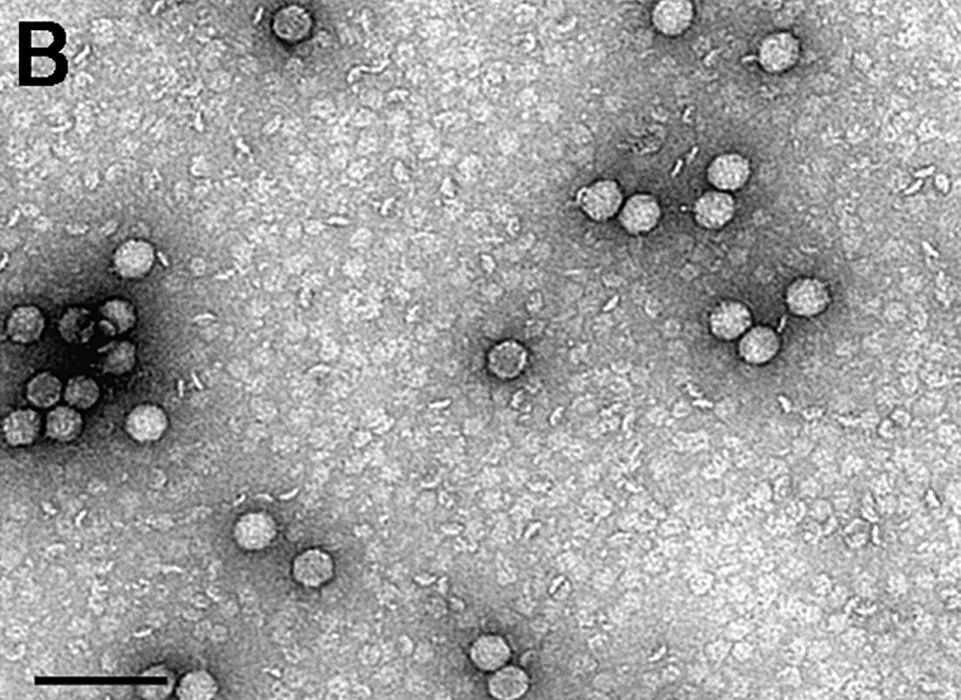
- TEM micrograph of Encephalomyocarditis virus virions bar scale equals 100 nm

Virus classification
- (unranked): Virus
- Realm: Riboviria
- Kingdom: Orthornavirae
- Phylum: Pisuviricota
- Class: Pisoniviricetes
- Order: Picornavirales
- Family: Picornaviridae
- Subfamily: Caphthovirinae
- Genus: Cardiovirus

= Cardiovirus =

Genus of viruses

Cardiovirus are a group of viruses within order Picornavirales, family Picornaviridae. Vertebrates serve as natural hosts for these viruses.

== Taxonomy ==
The genus contains the following species:

- Cardiovirus dhusarah (Cardiovirus F)
- Cardiovirus ranori (Cardiovirus C)
- Cardiovirus rudhira (Cardiovirus E)
- Cardiovirus rueckerti (Cardiovirus A), Encephalomyocarditis virus
- Cardiovirus saffoldi (Cardiovirus D), Saffold virus
- Cardiovirus theileri (Cardiovirus B), which contains Theiler's murine encephalomyelitis virus

== Structure ==
Cardioviruses are single-stranded RNA, non-enveloped viruses with icosahedral or spherical geometries, and a T=pseudo3 icosahedral capsid protein geometry. The diameter is around 30 nm. Genomes are linear and non-segmented, around 7.8 kb in length. The T=pseudo3 icosahedral capsid of Cadiovirus is made of 60 protomers, each of which contains 4 polypeptides: VP1, VP2, VP3, and VP4. Inside the capsid of the virus there is a single linear, positive single-stranded RNA. On both the 3' and 5' ends of the genome there are untranslated regions. These untranslated regions of genome are important for the DNA replication, with the untranslated region on the 5' side being the location of internal ribosomal entry site (IRES).

Genus	Structure	Symmetry	Capsid	Genomic arrangement	Genomic segmentation
Cardiovirus	Icosahedral	Pseudo T=3	Non-enveloped	Linear	Monopartite

== Life cycle ==
Viral replication is cytoplasmic. Entry into the host cell is achieved by attachment of the virus to host receptors, which mediates endocytosis. Replication follows the positive stranded RNA virus replication model. Positive stranded rna virus transcription is the method of transcription. Translation takes place by −1 ribosomal frameshifting, viral initiation, and ribosomal skipping. The virus exits the host cell by lysis, and viroporins. Human and vertebrates serve as the natural host. Transmission routes are zoonosis and fomite.

The 3’ end of the genome encodes a polyA tail while the 5’ end encodes a genome-linked protein. A unique feature of this genus is the presence of the L* protein, 18kDa, that is made out of frame from the polyprotein and is present in the DA subgroup of TMEV.

In the case of Encephalomyocarditis virus, the virus can cause encephalitis and myocarditis, mostly in rodents, which are natural hosts. The virus is transmitted from rodents to other animals. Severe epidemics have been seen in swine and elephants.

Genus	Host details	Tissue tropism	Entry details	Release details	Replication site	Assembly site	Transmission
Cardiovirus	Humans; vertebrates	Gastrointestinal tract; CNS; heart	Cell receptor endocytosis	Lysis	Cytoplasm	Cytoplasm	Zoonosis; fomite

== Clinical ==
Human cardioviruses were first isolated in 1981. Seven additional isolates have since been described in North America, Europe and South Asia. They have been associated with gastroenteritis, influenza-like symptoms and non-polio-associated acute flaccid paralysis. The first infection of cardiovirus in humans was identified in 2007 in a stool sample of an infant that was experiencing fever of unknown origin. It was subsequently named the Saffold virus after the lead researcher, Morris Saffold Jones.

Other pathogenic cardioviruses isolated from humans include the Syr-Darya valley fever virus and Vilyuisk human encephalomyelitis virus. Diseases associated with cardioviruses include: myocarditis, encephalitis, multiple sclerosis, and type 1 diabetes.

== See also ==
- Cardiovirus cis-acting replication element (CRE)
