= Christopher Andrewes =

British virologist (1896–1988)

Sir Christopher Howard Andrewes FRS
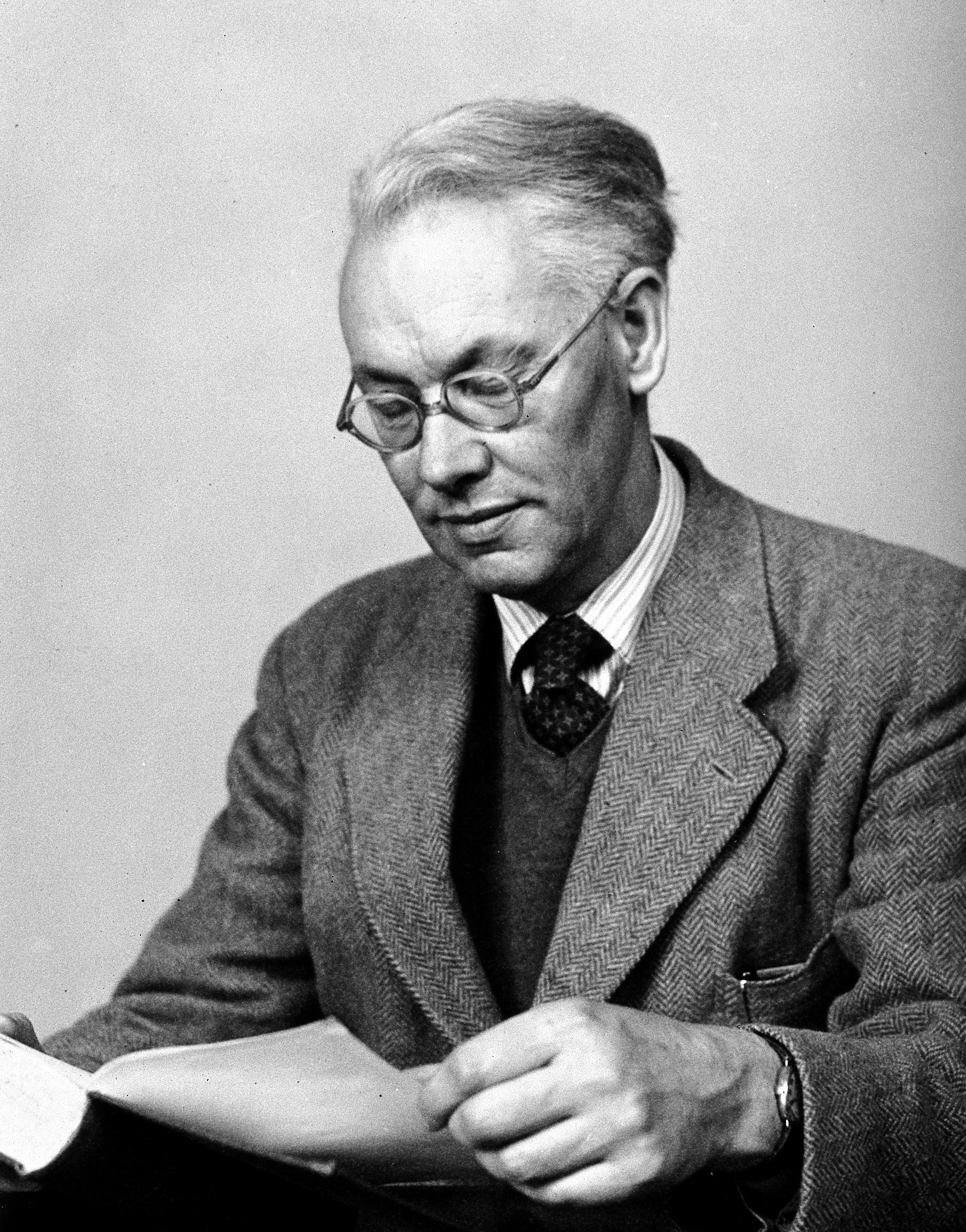
- Born: 7 June 1896
- Died: 31 December 1988 (aged 92); Salisbury
- Parent: Frederick William Andrewes
- Scientific career
- Education: St Bartholomew's Hospital
- Fields: Virology
- Workplaces: National Institute for Medical Research

Sir Christopher Howard Andrewes FRS (7 June 1896 – 31 December 1988) was a British virologist who discovered the human influenza A virus in 1933.

== Education ==
The son of a noted bacteriologist and physician, Frederick William Andrewes, Christopher Andrewes was educated at Highgate School and later studied medicine at St Bartholomew's Hospital.

== Career ==
He served in the Royal Navy as a surgeon during World War I. In 1927 he joined the scientific staff of the National Institute for Medical Research (NIMR) to assist Patrick Laidlaw in developing a vaccine against canine distemper. This led to research on influenza and the discovery of the causative virus in 1933 and subsequent vaccine development.

He was head of NIMR's Division of Bacteriology and Virus Research from 1939 to 1961, during which time he established the Common Cold Research Unit near Salisbury as an NIMR outpost in 1947 and the World Influenza Centre at Mill Hill in 1948, which spawned a worldwide network of collaborating centres. Andrewes was deputy director of NIMR from 1952–61 and retired in 1967.

He served as president of the Society for General Microbiology (now the Microbiology Society) from 1955 to 1957.

== Awards and honours ==
- 1939 Elected a Fellow of the Royal Society and was on the council from 1945–47.
- 1947 Awarded Bisset Hawkins Medal by the Royal College of Physicians
- 1955 Elected to the American Philosophical Society
- 1961 In the New Year Honours 1961 he was appointed a Knight Bachelor.
- 1964 Elected to the United States National Academy of Sciences
- 1965 Marjory Stephenson Prize from the Society for General Microbiology
- 1979 Robert Koch Gold Medal

== Personal life ==
Andrewes married Kathleen Lamb in 1927 and had three sons, two of whom became general practitioners.
