= Journal of General Virology =

- Discipline: Virology
- Language: English

Publication details
- History: 1967-present
- Publisher: Microbiology Society (United Kingdom)
- Frequency: Monthly
- Open access: Hybrid, delayed after 12 months
- Impact factor: 5.141 (2021)

Standard abbreviations
- ISO 4: J. Gen. Virol.

Indexing
- CODEN: JGVIAY
- ISSN: 0022-1317 (print); 1465-2099 (web)
- LCCN: 81644163
- OCLC no.: 802624762

Links
- Journal homepage; Online archive

Journal of General Virology is a not-for-profit peer-reviewed scientific journal published by the Microbiology Society. The journal was established in 1967 and covers research into animal, insect and plants viruses, also fungal viruses, prokaryotic viruses, and TSE agents. Antiviral compounds and clinical aspects of virus infection are also covered.

As of 2026, Rachel Fearns (Boston University) is the current editor-in-chief, following Paul Duprex (Center for Vaccine Research, University of Pittsburgh) who served from 2020-2025. Mark Harris (University of Leeds) served as editor-in-chief 2015-2020.

== Journal ==
=== Article types ===
Journal of General Virology publishes primary research articles, Reviews, Short Communications, Personal Views, and Editorials.

Since 2017 the journal has partnered with the International Committee on Taxonomy of Viruses to publish Open Access ICTV Virus Taxonomy Profiles which summarise chapters of the ICTV's 10th Report on Virus Taxonomy. All ICTV Virus Taxonomy Profiles are published under a Creative Commons Attribution license (CC-BY).

=== Metrics ===
The Microbiology Society journals are a signatory to DORA (the San Francisco Declaration on Research Assessment) and use a range of Article-Level Metrics (ALMs) as well as a range of journal-level metrics to assess quality and impact. An Altmetric score and Dimensions citation data are available for all articles published by the Microbiology Society journals.

=== Abstracting and indexing ===
Journal of General Virology is indexed in Biological Abstracts, BIOSIS Previews, CAB Abstracts, Chemical Abstracts Service, Current Awareness in Biological Sciences, Current Contents– Life Sciences, Current Opinion series, EMBASE, MEDLINE/Index Medicus/PubMed, Russian Academy of Science, Science Citation Index, SciSearch, SCOPUS, and on Google Scholar.

== Open access policy ==
Journal of General Virology is a hybrid title and allows authors to publish subscription articles free-of-charge. Authors can also publish Open Access articles under a Creative Commons Attribution license (CC-BY) by either paying an article processing charge (APC) or fee-free as part of a Publish and Read model.
