= Common Cold Unit =

British Medical Research Council unit

Coordinates: 51°3′12″N 1°48′8″W

The Common Cold Unit (CCU) or Common Cold Research Unit (CCRU) was a unit of the British Medical Research Council (MRC). The Unit undertook laboratory and epidemiological research on the common cold between 1946 and 1989 and produced 1,006 papers. The unit studied aetiology, epidemiology, prevention, and treatment of common colds. It was based on Harvard Hospital located at Harnham Down near Salisbury in England, previously an infectious diseases and then military hospital brought by the US to England in the beginning of the Second World War.

Common colds account for a majority of all acute respiratory infections, and the economic costs are substantial in terms of sick leave. The public-facing side of the CCU involved continually recruiting human volunteers, by advertising. Volunteers were housed at the hospital, typically for ten days while participating in common cold trials. Some degree of isolation from each other was enforced as well as restrictions on leaving the site.

Human coronaviruses, which are responsible for about 10% of common colds, were first isolated from volunteers at the unit in 1965. The unit closed in 1990, and the area was later redeveloped and absorbed into the city of Salisbury, although there is a memorial plaque at the site referring to its former use as the Harvard Hospital.

== History ==
=== Dr Kruse's 1914 findings ===
In 1914 at the Hygienic Institute, University of Leipzig, German bacteriologist Dr. Walther Kruse took a sample of nasal secretions from his assistant who had a head cold, diluted it 15-fold with Saline solution and filtered it to remove all bacteria. Four out of the twelve members of his staff who were given drops of this solution up their nose developed a cold between one and three days after receiving the drops. It was the first direct evidence that colds were an infectious disease and that they were caused by something other than bacteria. (Note: Note: During WW I Kruse served in the German medical Corps, it appears that Christopher Andrewes met him - lost citation, need to find it [Pyrotec].)

=== Alphonse Dochez's 1920s / 1930s research ===
In 1930, Dr Alphonse Dochez, a bacteriologist, at the Rockefeller Institute began to follow up the work that Dr. Walther Kruse started. He and his assistants found that Chimpanzees exhibit most of the signs of the common cold

They suspected that Chimpanzees might be able to catch colds from their, human, keepers; and that they had all the symptoms of a human cold, except fever. To test this, the keepers had to wear gowns and face masks: the chimpanzees with infected with bacterial-free filtered human common cold secretions; and, seven out of sixteen chimpanzees caught colds.

=== Christopher Andrewes ===
The virologist Christopher Andrewes met Alphonse Dochez, in New York, in 1931, by accident and became interested in his work. Dochez and his assistants were carrying out work, under conditions of isolation, on both chimpanzees and humans infected with filtered bacteria-free filtrates of nasal samples taken from people with colds. Dochez's group were also attempting to cultivate cold viruses obtained from human nasal samples, using chopped up chick embryos dispersed in an oxygen-free medium. Andrewes reported Dochez's progress to Henry Hallett Dale, head of the National Institute for Medical Research (NIMR) in August 1931. However, due to the depression, there was insufficient MRC money available to pay a researcher for more than six months and this was considered to be inadequate.

Andrewes recruited about 100 medical students from St Bartholomew's Hospital, City of London, and carried out the tests on groups of between eight and ten students at a time, instead of using chimpanzees, as student volunteers were cheaper. (Note: It was noted that these students were not practicing on hospital patients, so no patients should have been put at risk from these trials.) No attempt was made to isolate the students and they carried on with their studies. Andrewes was able produce colds in these volunteers using nasal samples taken from people with colds. However, he was unable to confirm Dochez's findings that these viruses could be grown in chick embryo oxygen-free medium. Dochez came to London with some of his cultures, but Andrewes again had negative results; and, in 1932, the MRC terminated these studies.

In 1939, Andrewes' became head of NIMR's Division of Bacteriology and Virus Research, one of three divisions in the NIMR.

=== Harvard Hospital site ===
The Harvard Hospital was established in 1941 as part of a UK Emergency Hospital programme. It was funded and staffed by Harvard University and the American Red Cross to provide medical assistance and study infectious diseases during World War II. The Ministry of Health (for England and Wales) bought the land from its existing owners; provided services, including water, electricity and sewage; and, paid for the on-going running costs, buying the food, cooking, cleaning and laundry.

The hospital was scheduled to be ready for receiving patients by 22 September 1941. It had fewer patient's beds than other emergency hospitals set up under emergency hospital-building programme, in this case only 125 beds, but hosted a fully-equipped emergency public health laboratory to handle infectious diseases. In addition, on-site living accommodation and facilities for the American volunteer doctors, nurses and non-medical personnel; and, a decontamination unit were provided.

Statistics later showed that a majority of its patients were infectious troop casualties brought back from Europe, but there were, also, civilian patients. When the US entered the war, the hospital was taken over by the US Army and it remained in their care until the war's end in 1945. The American Red Cross and Harvard University, the owners of the hospital, then donated it free of charge to the United Kingdom Public Health authorities.

== Creation of the Common Cold Unit ==
In 1946, Christopher Andrewes and other researchers at the NIMR, at Hampstead, obtained agreement from the Medical Research Council to set up the Common Cold Unit at the Harvard Hospital site, with MRC funding. (Note: The Ministry of Health provided the facility and maintenance staff, while the MRC funded the scientific research.)

The initial aims of the Unit were to identify the viruses that caused the Common Cold, in humans; and, to learn how to propagate them in a laboratory, so that they could be studied.

=== Adapting the existing hospital facilities for Common Cold testing ===
Six existing, prefabricated, staff accommodation buildings were repurposed into twelve self-contained flats to house the human volunteers. All the occupants of a flat, for the duration of the trial, were regarded as a single group, so each trial could use up to twelve groups; and each flat had to provide the necessary medical isolation of a group from both the Unit's staff and the other groups.

Each fully-furnished flat had living accommodation for two or three people, so a flat could house a married couple, or two or three single people; there was a telephone, a sitting room, a small kitchen / diner. In addition, each flat had a dedicated medical examination room for Matron to carry out medical checks, in private, on each volunteer; and a semi-enclosed porch outside the flat's entrance door. This layout of flat and external porch was designed to maintain strict isolation between groups and between medical staff and individual groups.

The attached porches had two main uses: volunteers were not allowed to go shopping in the local residential areas, so food was purchased by the hospital and cooked in the central kitchen for delivery in insulated food containers to the porch of each flat for its occupants to retrieve once the kitchen staff had departed. Its second use was to safely store protective coverings and face masks for use by the medical staff; to provide a space for the staff to put them on before entering the flat so as to carry out the mandatory daily checks on each volunteer: known as Matron's check; and to remove them when leaving the flat.

Some of the former hospital wards were adapted to provide indoor recreation facilities for the volunteers. Segregation requirements meant that volunteers from one group had a keep at minimum of 30 feet (9.1 m) from volunteers from another group. However, provided they complied with these segregation requirements, volunteers could make use of the indoor and outdoor recreation facilities provided by the unit. There was also a large briefing room of all the volunteers to socialise, meet each other and the medical staff at the start of their trial; and to be told the aims of that particular trial.

== Testing of human volunteers ==
=== Ethics ===
In 1992 Dr Tyrrell wrote, reflecting backwards on the ethics of carrying out trials on human subjects at the Common Cold Unit. In 1946, when the Unit started up, the Nuremberg trial was current news; and later, in June 1964, the Helsinki Declaration was adopted in Helsinki, Finland. Both of these events would strongly influence what particular types of testing the Medical Research Council would allow the Unit to carry out on human subjects.

As an example, he mentioned one particular suggestion as to how volunteers might be found: it was that Prisoners released on parole (requiring good conduct), or servicemen might, be recruited. However, it was decided that "being under strong discipline they could not be considered to volunteer freely"; and, so the suggestion was rejected. However, it was decided that servicemen on paid leave could volunteer, if this was their own personal decision. People offering themselves as volunteers for testing, had to approach the Unit; they would be sent written details of what might be involved; and, the day they arrived they would attend detailed briefings about that particular ten-day test. Volunteers could leave if they did not like being at the Unit, so there was no coercion on anyone to attend, or to stay.

=== The Volunteers' experience ===
Twenty to thirty volunteers were required every fortnight during Common Cold trial periods. The unit advertised in newspapers and magazines for volunteers, who were paid a small amount. (Note: Volunteers received free accommodation in a centrally heated flat and free meals. The amount given was described as 'pocket money') A stay at the unit was presented in these advertisements as an unusual holiday opportunity. (Note: It appears that volunteers, when they left at the end of a trial were given these adverts to hand out to their friends, workmates, follow club members.)

Potential volunteers had to contact the Unit in advance - they could not just turn up; and, if accepted, would be given a list of trial dates, written information on: the CCU; the facilities; the restrictions on (not) socialising / leaving the site; and the trial procedures, particularly what would happen to them. (Note: It is not known if potential volunteer had to provide relevant medical information at this stage about, for example, any allergies, asthma, etc, or whether this information was sought during the first day at the CCU.) Intake day was usually a Wednesday. With ten-day trials, this gave the Unit a few days to clean up and decontaminate the accommodation, ready for the next ten-day trial. UK non-local volunteers would usually be able to travel to and from the Unit by train; and would be collected at Salisbury railway station and taken to the Unit by road transport. (Note: It is not known for certain how this was administered. The volunteer may have received a Railway warrant which was to be presented at the volunteer's nearest railway station and exchanged for a return train ticket, or they bought their own return ticket and claimed the money back when the reached the CCU.) Volunteers from overseas, however, did not receive compensation for their travel expenses.

On intake day, volunteers could be collected from Salisbury's railway station or coach station and taken to the Unit. There, they would all have lunch with the staff in the dining room. Afterwards, there were several Introductory talks, given by the Medical Superintendent, the Matron and the Executive Officer, where they would learn about the trial being run, the sports facilities available and local walks. If they came alone, they would meet their flat-mate.

They would have a medical examination, by the Medical Superintendent, which included a chest X-ray. As a screening test, no treatments were applied during the next four days. However, if a volunteer presented symptoms of the Common Cold within these first five days, they were considered ineligible to continue the trial. Volunteers could be asked to leave if they broke the isolation rules.

Volunteers were either to be infected with preparations of cold viruses, or they were used as a control group. The control groups would be given a preparation that was free any of infection. Volunteers typically stayed for ten days and were housed in small groups of two or three, with each group strictly isolated from the others during the course of their stay. They were allowed to go out for walks in the countryside south of Salisbury, but residential areas were out of bounds.

== Discoveries ==
The first coronavirus (B814) was found in washes from a boy with typical common cold symptoms in 1960 during the study led by virologist David Tyrrell at the Common Cold Unit. After washes were inoculated to volunteers and tested for known viruses none was found. Publication about first human coronavirus was published in The BMJ in 1965. Later virologist June Almeida imaged virus for the first time and group of eight virologists including June Almeida named it coronavirus in their publication in 1968.

== Results ==
During the CCU's existence, thousands of volunteers participated in research in which they were inoculated with common cold viruses or were in a control group, but no cure for the common cold was found. Some compounds were active against rhinoviruses in vitro but did not demonstrate clinical efficiency. Interferons alpha and beta administered intranasally before infection effectively prevented infection with rhinoviruses, coronaviruses, influenza viruses, and respiratory syncytial virus, but they were not as effective during treatment and had local side effects so they have not been used in routine practice against these viruses. Despite these dead ends, the findings made by the CCU improved the understanding of respiratory viruses, their lifecycles, and possible vaccines. A key finding was the level of the Hemagglutination assay that could be used as Correlates of immunity for influenza vaccines.

== Sources ==
=== Books ===
- Andrewes, Sir Christopher (1965). The Common Cold. The Advancement of Science. London: Weidenfeld & Nicolson.
- Andrewes, C. H. (1967). The Natural History of Viruses. The World Naturalist. London: Weidenfeld & Nicolson.
- Dunn, Leiut. Colonel C. L. (1952). The Emergency Medical Services, Volume I: England and Wales. History of the Second World War: Medical Volumes. London: H.M.S.O and Longmans, Green and Co.
- Eccles, Ronald; Weber, Olaf (2009). Common Cold. Birkhauser Advances in Infectious Diseases. Basel: Birkhauser. ISBN 978-3-7643-9894-1.
- Tyrrell, David; Michael Fielder (2002). Cold Wars: The Fight against the Common Cold. New York: Oxford University Press. ISBN 0-19-263285-X.

=== Journals, papers and newspapers ===
- Heidelberger, Michael; Kneeland, Yale; Miles Price, Katherine (1971), Alphonse Raymond Dochez, 1882-1964: A Biographical Memoir (PDF), Washington, D.C.: National Academy of Sciences
- Tyrrell, D A J (June 1992). "Mini Review: A view from the Common Cold Unit". Antiviral Res. 18 (2): 105–125. doi:10.1016/0166-3542(92)90032-Z. PMC 7133934. PMID 1329647.
- Richmond, Caroline (June 2005). "Obituary: David Tyrrell". BMJ. 330 (7505): 1451. doi:10.1136/bmj.330.7505.1451. PMC 558394.
- "David Tyrrell obituary". The Times 2008-02-17. London. 18 May 2005. Archived from the original on 10 March 2007.

=== Web sites ===
- "John Everett Gordon". London: Royal College of Physicians.
- "The Medical Research Council Common Cold Research Unit". Ministry of Defence. Archived from the original on 26 October 2012.
