= Coronavirus diseases =

Diseases caused by coronavirus infections

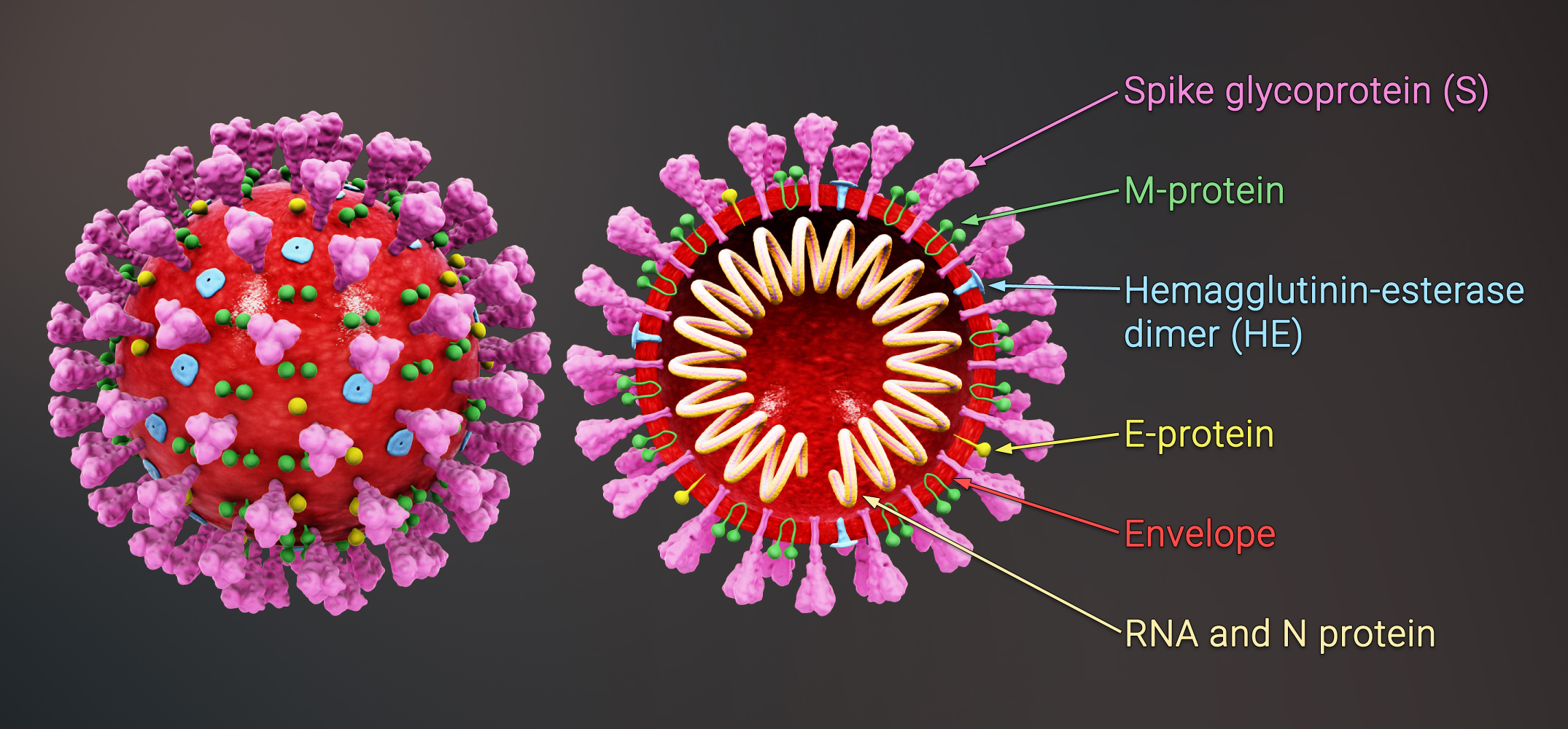
Structural view of a coronavirus

Coronavirus diseases are caused by viruses in the coronavirus subfamily, a group of related RNA viruses that cause diseases in mammals and birds. In humans and birds, the group of viruses cause respiratory tract infections that can range from mild to lethal. Mild illnesses in humans include some cases of the common cold (which is also caused by other viruses, predominantly rhinoviruses), while more lethal varieties can cause SARS, MERS and COVID-19. As of 2021, 45 species are registered as coronaviruses, whilst 11 diseases have been identified, as listed below.

Coronaviruses are known for their shape resembling a stellar corona, such as that of the Sun visible during a total solar eclipse; corona is derived from Latin corōna 'garland, wreath, crown'. It was coined by Tony Waterson (professor of virology at St Thomas' Hospital) in a meeting with his colleagues June Almeida and David Tyrrell, the founding fathers of coronavirus studies, and was first used in a Nature article in 1968, with approval by the International Committee for the Nomenclature of Viruses three years later.

The first coronavirus disease was discovered in the late 1920s. Coronaviridae were generally of limited interest to the wider scientific community, until the appearance of SARS. Human coronaviruses were discovered in the 1960s, through a variety of experiments in the United States and the United Kingdom. A common origin in human coronaviruses is bats.

== List ==
Coronavirus diseases
Host organism	Disease	Pathogen	Year of Discovery	Details
Birds	Avian infectious bronchitis	Avian coronavirus (IBV)	1920s (isolated in 1938)	Discovered in North America.
Pigs, dogs, cats	Enteritis	Transmissible gastroenteritis virus (TGEV)	1946 (isolated in 1965)	Infects pigs, cats, and dogs.
Humans	Common cold	Human coronavirus 229E (HCoV‑229E)	1930s (isolated in 1965)	Possibly originated from bats.
Mice, rats	Encephalitis	MHV-JHM, a strain of murine coronavirus (M‑CoV) named after John Howard Mueller.	1949	
Humans	Common cold	Human coronavirus OC43 (HCoV‑OC43)	1967	Possibly originated from rodents, then jumped through cattle to humans.
Pigs	Enteritis	Porcine epidemic diarrhea virus (PEDV)	1971	Infects pigs. Caused outbreaks in 1972 and 1978, 2010, 2013, 2014, and 2015.
Dogs	Enteritis	Canine coronavirus (CCoV)	1971	
Cats	Feline infectious peritonitis (FIP)	Feline coronavirus (FCoV)		
Cattle	Enteritis	Bovine coronavirus (BCV or BCoV)		
Humans	Severe acute respiratory syndrome (SARS)	Severe acute respiratory syndrome coronavirus (SARS‑CoV or SARS‑CoV‑1), a strain of severe acute respiratory syndrome–related coronavirus (SARSr‑CoV)	2002	Discovered in Foshan, China. Caused the 2002–2004 SARS outbreak. Possibly originated from horseshoe bats.
Humans	Common cold	Human coronavirus HKU1 (HCoV‑HKU1)	2004	Discovered in Hong Kong, China.
Humans	Common cold	Human coronavirus NL63 (HCoV‑NL63)	2004	Discovered in Amsterdam, Netherlands. Possibly originated from tricolored bats.
Chinese bulbuls		Bulbul coronavirus HKU11 (BulbulCoV‑HKU11)	2008	Discovered in Hong Kong, China.
Humans	Middle East respiratory syndrome (MERS)	Middle East respiratory syndrome–related coronavirus (MERS‑CoV)	2012	Discovered in Jeddah, Saudi Arabia. Caused outbreaks in 2012, 2015, and 2018.
Pigs	Enteritis	Porcine coronavirus HKU15 (PorCov‑HKU15)	2014	Discovered in Hong Kong, China.
Humans	Coronavirus disease 2019 (COVID‑19)	Severe acute respiratory syndrome coronavirus 2 (SARS‑CoV‑2), a strain of SARSr‑CoV	2019	Discovered in Wuhan, China. Caused the COVID-19 pandemic. Possibly originated from pangolins, horseshoe bats, or both.

== See also ==
- Alphacoronavirus
- Betacoronavirus
- Gammacoronavirus
- Deltacoronavirus
