= TMEM198 =

Protein

Identifiers
- Aliases: TMEM198, TMEM198A, transmembrane protein 198
- External IDs: MGI: 2443133; HomoloGene: 44245; GeneCards: TMEM198; OMA:TMEM198 - orthologs

Gene location (Human)
Chr.	Chromosome 2 (human)
Band	2q35	Start	219,543,663 bp
Band	2q35	End	219,550,595 bp

Gene location (Mouse)
Chr.	Chromosome 1 (mouse)
Band	1|1 C4	Start	75,456,176 bp
Band	1|1 C4	End	75,462,349 bp
RNA expression pattern
Bgee	Human / Mouse (ortholog); Top expressed in: prefrontal cortex; anterior pituitary; right frontal lobe; right hemisphere of cerebellum; right ovary; left ovary; cingulate gyrus; anterior cingulate cortex; dorsolateral prefrontal cortex; ganglionic eminence / Top expressed in: visual cortex; piriform cortex; primary motor cortex; primary visual cortex; cingulate gyrus; superior frontal gyrus; superior cervical ganglion; prefrontal cortex; subiculum; olfactory tubercle; More reference expression data
BioGPS	n/a
Orthologs
Species	Human	Mouse
Entrez	130612	319998
Ensembl	ENSG00000188760	ENSMUSG00000051703
UniProt	Q66K66	Q8BG75
RefSeq (mRNA)	NM_001303098; NM_001005209	NM_177056
RefSeq (protein)	NP_001005209; NP_001290027	NP_796030
Location (UCSC)	Chr 2: 219.54 – 219.55 Mb	Chr 1: 75.46 – 75.46 Mb
PubMed search
- Wikidata
View/Edit Human	View/Edit Mouse

TMEM198 (Transmembrane Protein 198) is a protein in humans encoded by the TMEM198 gene, also known as TMEM198A. TMEM198 is known to promote LRP6 phosphorylation by casein kinases. Furthermore, a knockdown of TMEM198 in Vero cells significantly reduces the production of PEDV and SADS. Porcine Epidemic Diarrhea Virus (PEDV) and Swine Acute Diarrhea Syndrome Coronavirus (SADS) are both coronaviruses that infect pigs.

== Gene ==
TMEM198 gene is located on chromosome 2 (2q35), with a plus orientation.

TMEM198 has 5 exons and spans 6,568 bp, with the coding region 1,083 bp. The fifth exon is hard to discern, which is due to being too small to detect and/or located near the UTR regions. TMEM198 is principally observed in the Brain ( expressed at 2.52), Ovary (4.71), and testes (2.19). The overexpression of TMEM198 promotes tumor growth, which leads to cancers such as Rectosigmoid Cancer.

In the gene neighborhood of the human gene TMEM198, there are notable genes located such as: Acid-sensing ion channel 4 (ASIC4), inhibin subunit alpha (INHA), and GDP-Mannose Pyrophosphorylase A (GMPPA) are all upstream of TMEM198. While Chondroitin Polymerizing Factor (CHPF), ODS1, and ASIC4 Antisense RNA 1 (ASCIC4-AS1) are all downstream.

== Protein ==
TMEM198 is 360 amino acids long, with long untranslated regions (UTRs). The conceptual translation of TMEM198 depicts multiple transmembrane regions as well as phosphorylation sites.

The first 3 labeled missense mutations do not affect major proteins. This was determined with multiple sequence alignment to identify the most conserved proteins among multiple vertebrates. However, the last two missense mutations affect a protein that is highly conserved within all tested vertebrates, highlighting its importance.

In humans, TMEM198 has a molecular weight of 39.3kDa and a theoretical pI of approximately 10.0. TMEM198 is predicted to be positively charged at physiological pH. TMEM198 also has a high Leu% (16.7%), thus making TMEM198 hydrophobic.

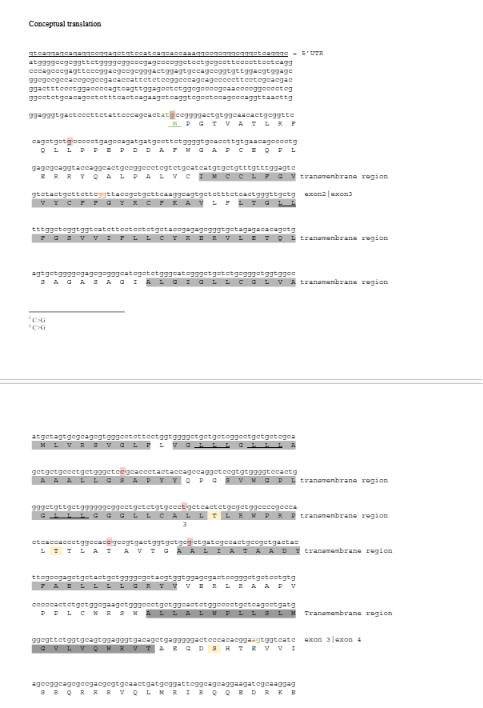

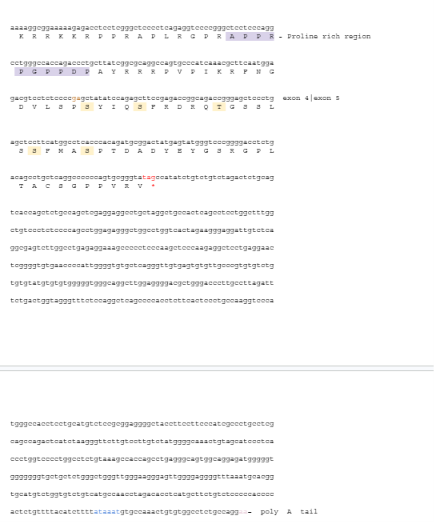

== Structure ==
TMEM198 has 15 alternate splice variants and 3 distinct transcript variants. The 3 main transcript variants encode the same protein, NP_001005209.1, thus making TMEM198 only have one protein isoform.

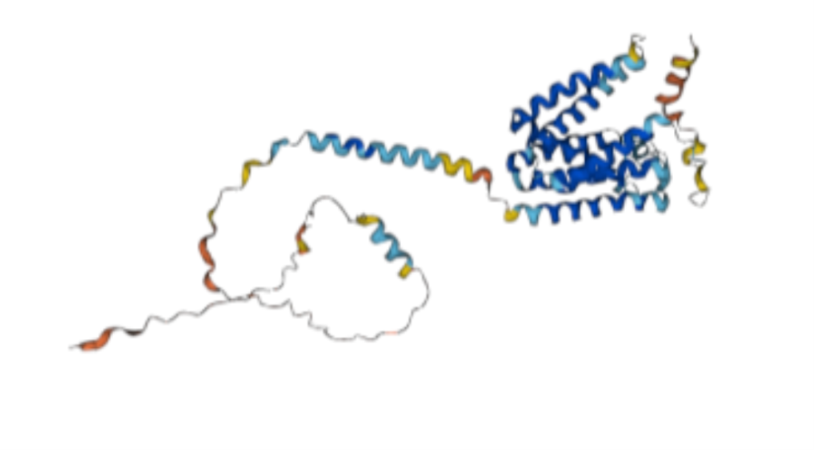

The structure of TMEM198 can be noted to have alpha helices as the area with main confidence, while the beta sheets are of lower confidence in the true structure.

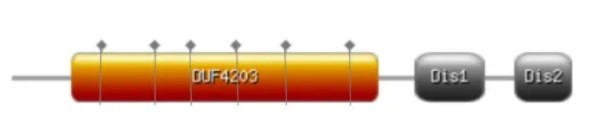

There are 6 transmembrane helices (hydrophobic alpha helices). This is to be considered as more evidence shows that TMEM198 has 7 transmembrane helices, with the seventh one having a lower probability of appearing as compared to the first 6.

Dis1 and Dis2 are regions with no fixed 3d structure. It’s located at the C-terminus end of the protein, in the cytoplasm, thus making it the protein's signaling end. UniProt does note that the protein is involved in Wnt signalling via LRP6. The first 35 amino acids at the N- terminal of TMEM198 are necessary for viral replication as well as the formation of DMVs (Double-Membrane Vesicles)

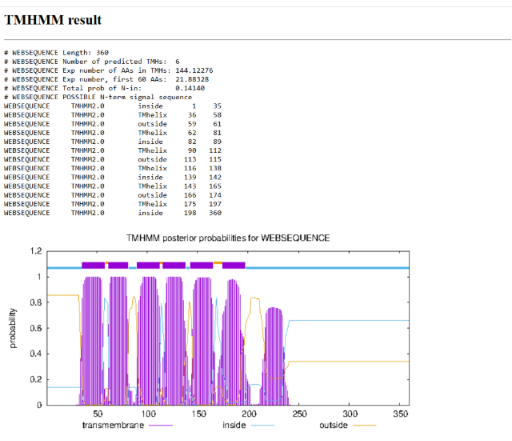

== Homologs ==
=== Ortholog table ===
The following table provides a few details on orthologs of the human version of TMEM198. To save space, not all of these orthologs are included in the multiple sequence alignment. Only the listed vertebrates were included. These orthologs were identified through TimeTree and BLAST searches. The table is categorized by increasing date of divergence from the human lineage, with Hazel plant being the furthest known ortholog of TMEM198.

A major trend of the Ortholog table is that as the date of divergence from the human lineage increases, so does the sequence length. There are a few outliers to this trend, but it is otherwise notable.

TMEM198 has no known paralog in the human genome.

	Genus and species	Common name	taxonomic group (order)	date of divergence from the human lineage (MYA)	accession number	sequence length (aa)	sequence identity to a human protein
mammals	Homo sapiens	humans	Primates	0	NP_001005209.1	360	100%
	Cercocebus atys	sooty-mangabey	Cercopithecidae	28.8	XP_032133956.1	360	99.4%
	Mesoplodon densirostris	Blainville's beaked whale	Cetacea	94	XP_059962316.1	360	97.5%
	Vulpes lagopus	Arctic fox	Carnivora	94	XP_041593119	360	98.33%
Birds	Aptenodytes forsteri	emperor penguin	Sphenisciformes	319	XP_009273195.1	367	62.81%
	Cygnus atratus	black swan	atratus	319	XP_035392715	365	61.79%
	Aphelocoma coerulescens	scrub jay	Passeriformes	319	XP_068876958.1	402	63.09%
Amphibian	Xenupus laevis	African clawed frog	Anura	352	XP_018091162.1	360	62.71%
	Ambystoma mexicanum	axolotl	Caudata	353	XP_069473046	367	59.51%
	Pleurodeles waltl	Iberian ribbed newt	Caudata.	353	XP_069083303.1	366	60.22%
	Leptodactylus fuscus	Rufuos frog	Anura	360	XP_075140669	360	62.71%
Fish	Pangasianodon hypophthalmus	Striped catfish	Siluriformes	429	XP_026768335	384	52.97%
	Barbatula barbatula	Stone loach	Cypriniformes	429	XP_079321182	380	55.09%
	Anguilla rostrata	American eel	Anguilliformes	429	XP_064185487.1	360	58.33%
	Conger conger	European conger	Anguilliformes	429	XP_061091512	365	58.49%
Cnidra	Montipora capricornis	Stony corals	Scleractinia	685	XP_068749306.1	342	31.01%
Insects	Homalodisca vitripennis	Glassy-winged sharpshooter	Hemiptera	686	XP_046670335.1	347	41.7%
	Planococcus citri	citrus mealybug	Hemiptera	686	XP_065218741.1	397	33.22%
	Lampyridae	firefly	Coleoptera	686	XP_031343369.1	349	37.94%
	Reduviidae	Assassin bug	Hemiptera	686	KAK9500599.1	301	34%
plants	Corylus avellana	Hazel	Fagales	1530	XP_059433272.1	773	31.94%

=== Multiple sequence alignment ===
The multiple sequence alignment (MSA) box-frame format. It demonstrates that TMEM198 is highly conserved across a wide range of vertebrate species, including mammals, fish, amphibians, and a bird (long-tailed hermit used as an outlier). (The American eel may not be a true TMEM198 ortholog given its FASTA header mislabeling). The consistency score of 96 indicates high confidence in the alignment, meaning the residue positions are strongly supported across pairwise comparisons.

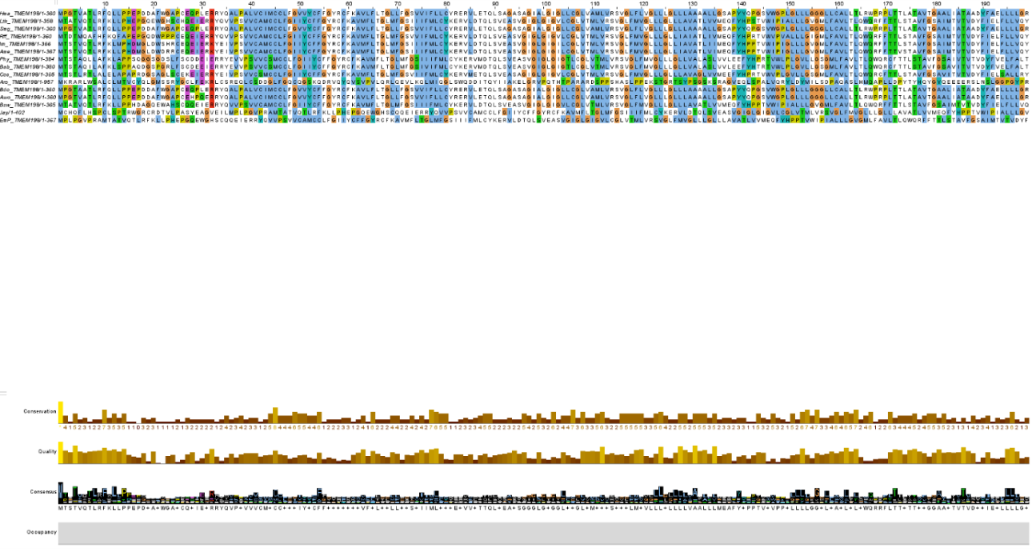
This depicts a multiple sequence alignment between strict orthologs of the human gene TMEM198, with the long-tailed hermit (bird) as an outlier.

=== Phylogenetic tree ===
The Phylogenetic tree depicts the evolutionary relationships among 15 vertebrate species from the Ortholog table, excluding Hazel, as it will exaggerate the results. The furthest relative in this phylogenetic tree is Anguilla rostrata.

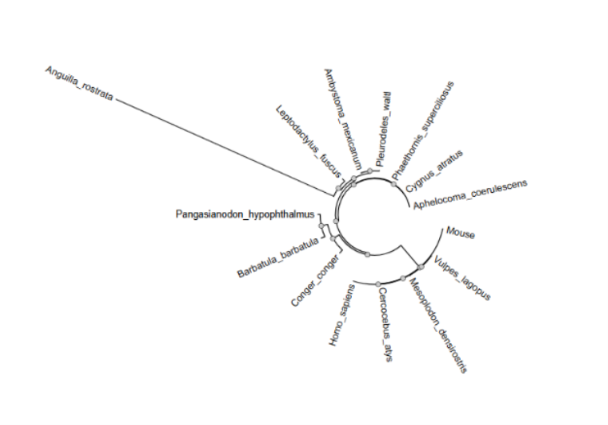
