= Ferret coronavirus =

Virus classification
- (unranked): Virus
- Realm: Riboviria
- Kingdom: Orthornavirae
- Phylum: Pisuviricota
- Class: Pisoniviricetes
- Order: Nidovirales
- Family: Coronaviridae
- Genus: Alphacoronavirus
- Subgenus: Minacovirus
- Species: Alphacoronavirus neovisontis
- Strain: Ferret coronavirus

Synonyms
- Green Slime Disease

Coronavirus that infects ferrets

The ferret coronavirus is a coronavirus which infects ferrets and is a strain of the species Alphacoronavirus neovisontis. The first cases in ferrets were detected in March 1993 in the east coast of the United States. It was previously known as Green Slime Disease. The illness is highly contagious among ferrets, has a short incubation period, and has a mortality rate of about 5 percent. Symptoms include diarrhea and intestinal damage. Less pronounced symptoms are bloody stools, dehydration, lethargy, weight loss, and weakness.

The reason that this disease is sometimes referred to as Green Slime Disease is that Green Slime Disease causes stool to turn dark green and fluorescent.

There are two types of ferret coronavirus. These are ferret enteric coronavirus and ferret systemic coronavirus.
