= Swine acute diarrhea syndrome coronavirus =

Virus classification
- (unranked): Virus
- Realm: Riboviria
- Kingdom: Orthornavirae
- Phylum: Pisuviricota
- Class: Pisoniviricetes
- Order: Nidovirales
- Family: Coronaviridae
- Genus: Alphacoronavirus
- Subgenus: Rhinacovirus
- Virus: Swine acute diarrhea syndrome coronavirus

Type of Alphacoronavirus affecting swine

Swine acute diarrhea syndrome coronavirus (SADS-CoV) is a coronavirus related to Rhinolophus bat coronavirus HKU2. It is transmitted through the feces of horseshoe bats to pigs. Piglets less than 5 days old die with a probability of up to 90%.

The first outbreak appeared in 2017, where it caused the death of more than 24,000 piglets on 4 farms. In 2018 and 2019, the virus re-emerged in China, but there were not large-scale losses. This weak re-emergence is curious, and is reminiscent of how SARS emerged in 2003 and then disappeared.

During in vitro testing, human and monkey cell lines exposed to SADS-CoV became infected, suggesting that SADS-CoV may pose a risk to human health.

The SADS-CoV sampled from one of the first infected pig farms was found to be 95% genetically identical to one collected from horseshoe bats (Rhinolophus), "indicating the bat origin of the pig virus".
