= Decacovirus =

Virus classification
- (unranked): Virus
- Realm: Riboviria
- Kingdom: Orthornavirae
- Phylum: Pisuviricota
- Class: Pisoniviricetes
- Order: Nidovirales
- Family: Coronaviridae
- Genus: Alphacoronavirus
- Subgenus: Decacovirus

Species
- See text

Subgenus of viruses

Decacovirus is a subgenus of viruses in the genus Alphacoronavirus.

== Species ==
The subgenus contains the following species, listed by scientific name and followed by the exemplar virus of the species:

- Alphacoronavirus australiense, Alphacoronavirus WA3607
- Alphacoronavirus ferrumequini, Rhinolophus ferrumequinum alphacoronavirus HuB-2013
- Alphacoronavirus hipposideri, Hipposideros pomona bat coronavirus CHB25
- Alphacoronavirus rousetti, Rousettus bat coronavirus HKU10
