= Sunacovirus =

Virus classification
- (unranked): Virus
- Realm: Riboviria
- Kingdom: Orthornavirae
- Phylum: Pisuviricota
- Class: Pisoniviricetes
- Order: Nidovirales
- Family: Coronaviridae
- Genus: Alphacoronavirus
- Subgenus: Sunacovirus
- Species: Alphacoronavirus sunci

Subgenus of viruses

Sunacovirus, also known as Suncus murinus coronavirus X74, Xīngguō-74, or the Wénchéng shrew virus (WESV), is a subgenus of viruses in the genus Alphacoronavirus, consisting of a single species, Alphacoronavirus sunci. It was first described in 2017 by Wen Wang and colleagues, when it was discovered infecting a population of Asian house shrews.
