= NL63-related bat coronavirus =

Virus classification
- (unranked): Virus
- Realm: Riboviria
- Kingdom: Orthornavirae
- Phylum: Pisuviricota
- Class: Pisoniviricetes
- Order: Nidovirales
- Family: Coronaviridae
- Genus: Alphacoronavirus
- Subgenus: Setracovirus
- Species: Alphacoronavirus triaenopis

Species of virus

NL63-related bat coronavirus (Alphacoronavirus triaenopis) is a species of coronavirus in the genus Alphacoronavirus.
