= Minunacovirus =

Virus classification
- (unranked): Virus
- Realm: Riboviria
- Kingdom: Orthornavirae
- Phylum: Pisuviricota
- Class: Pisoniviricetes
- Order: Nidovirales
- Family: Coronaviridae
- Genus: Alphacoronavirus
- Subgenus: Minunacovirus

Subgenus of viruses

Minunacovirus is a subgenus of viruses in the genus Alphacoronavirus.

== Taxonomy ==
The genus contains the following species, listed by scientific name and followed by the exemplar virus of the species:

- Alphacoronavirus miniopteri, Miniopterus bat coronavirus HKU8
- Alphacoronavirus pusilli, Miniopterus bat coronavirus 1
