= Pipistrellus kuhlii coronavirus 3398 =

Virus classification
- (unranked): Virus
- Realm: Riboviria
- Kingdom: Orthornavirae
- Phylum: Pisuviricota
- Class: Pisoniviricetes
- Order: Nidovirales
- Family: Coronaviridae
- Genus: Alphacoronavirus
- Subgenus: Nyctacovirus
- Species: Alphacoronavirus pipistrelli

Species of virus

Pipistrellus kuhlii coronavirus 3398 is a species of coronavirus in the genus Alphacoronavirus.
