= Munia coronavirus HKU13 =

Virus classification
- (unranked): Virus
- Realm: Riboviria
- Kingdom: Orthornavirae
- Phylum: Pisuviricota
- Class: Pisoniviricetes
- Order: Nidovirales
- Family: Coronaviridae
- Genus: Deltacoronavirus
- Subgenus: Buldecovirus
- Species: Deltacoronavirus lonchurae

Species of virus

Munia coronavirus HKU13 (Deltacoronavirus lonchurae) is a species of coronavirus in the genus Deltacoronavirus.

== Munia coronavirus HKU13 ==
Munia coronavirus HKU13 (Deltacoronavirus lonchurae) is a species of coronavirus in the genus Deltacoronavirus that primarily infects birds of the genus Lonchura, commonly known as munias or mannikins.

== Classification and discovery ==
Munia coronavirus HKU13 belongs to the genus Deltacoronavirus, which is one of the four genera in the family Coronaviridae. The virus was first discovered by researchers from the University of Hong Kong during surveillance of coronaviruses in wild birds. Its identification helped expand knowledge of coronavirus host range and evolution.

== Genetic characteristics ==
The virus has a positive-sense, single-stranded RNA genome typical of coronaviruses. Genomic analyses show that HKU13 shares similarities with other avian deltacoronaviruses, supporting the hypothesis that birds serve as natural reservoirs for members of this genus.

== Importance in research ==
Studying Munia coronavirus HKU13 improves understanding of interspecies transmission of coronaviruses, viral evolution, and the potential for zoonotic spillover. It also serves as a model for examining coronavirus adaptation mechanisms in avian hosts.
