= Miniopterus bat coronavirus 1 =

Virus classification
- (unranked): Virus
- Realm: Riboviria
- Kingdom: Orthornavirae
- Phylum: Pisuviricota
- Class: Pisoniviricetes
- Order: Nidovirales
- Family: Coronaviridae
- Genus: Alphacoronavirus
- Subgenus: Minunacovirus
- Species: Alphacoronavirus pusilli

Species of virus

Miniopterus bat coronavirus 1 (Mi-BatCoV 1) is the first coronavirus found in bats, sampled in summer 2003 and published in February 2005.

It is a enveloped, single-stranded positive-sense RNA virus species in the Alphacoronavirus, or Group 1, genus with a corona-like morphology. Isolates have not been found in humans.

== Reservoir ==
The Miniopterus bat is a bent-winged bat found throughout Asia and the Middle East. Isolates of Miniopterus Bat CoV-1 have not been found in humans. Bat-CoV-1A and 1B have been also isolated from Miniopterus magnater and Miniopterus pusillus in Hong Kong. Phylogenetic analysis revealed that these group 1 bat coronaviruses have descended from a common ancestor. The four different but closely related group 1 alphacoronaviruses (bat-CoV 1A, 1B, HKU7 and HKU8), have been isolated from otherwise healthy bats which suggests that these viruses are well established in these species.

== Transmission ==
Transmission of Miniopterus Bat CoV-1 within the species is believed to be through droplet-respiration from contaminates of saliva and excreta. There is also evidence of interspecies transmission of coronavirus among bats.

== Genome ==
All the Alpha and betacoronaviruses, Group 1 and Group 2, are derived from the bat gene pool. There are at least four different, but closely related, Alphacoronaviruses (bat-CoV 1A, 1B, HKU7 and HKU8) circulating in bent-winged bats. Coronaviruses in bats are descended from a common ancestor and have been evolving in bats over a long period of time.

A significant percentage of newly emerging viruses are RNA viruses. It is believed this is due to the fact that RNA viruses have a much higher nucleotide mutation rate than DNA viruses.

== Habitat ==
The common bent-wing bat can be found in the following countries: Afghanistan, Albania, Algeria, Armenia, Australia, Austria, Azerbaijan, Bosnia and Herzegovina, Bulgaria, Cameroon, China, Croatia, possibly Ethiopia, France, Georgia, Gibraltar, Greece, Guinea, Hungary, India, Indonesia, Iran, Iraq, Israel, Italy, Japan, Jordan, possibly Kenya, North Korea, South Korea, Laos, Lebanon, Liberia, Libyan Arab Jamahiriya, Malaysia, Malta, Montenegro, Morocco, Myanmar, Nepal, Nigeria, North Macedonia, Pakistan, Palestine, Papua New Guinea, Philippines, Portugal, Romania, Russian Federation, San Marino, Saudi Arabia, Serbia, Sierra Leone, Slovakia, Slovenia, Solomon Islands, Spain, Sri Lanka, Switzerland, Syrian Arab Republic, Taiwan, Tajikistan, Thailand, Tunisia, Turkey, Turkmenistan, Vietnam, and Yemen.

== See also ==
- Common bent-wing bat
- Murinae
- Severe acute respiratory syndrome (SARS)
- Zoonosis
