= Scotophilus bat coronavirus 512 =

Virus classification
- (unranked): Virus
- Realm: Riboviria
- Kingdom: Orthornavirae
- Phylum: Pisuviricota
- Class: Pisoniviricetes
- Order: Nidovirales
- Family: Coronaviridae
- Genus: Alphacoronavirus
- Subgenus: Pedacovirus
- Species: Alphacoronavirus scotophili

Species of virus

Scotophilus bat coronavirus 512 (Bat-CoV 512) is an enveloped, single-stranded positive-sense RNA virus species in the Alphacoronavirus, or Group 1, genus with a corona-like morphology. It was isolated from a lesser Asiatic yellow house bat discovered in southern China.

== Genome ==
Sc-BatCoV-512 shares a common evolutionary origin in the spike protein of Bat-SARS CoV. This spike protein shares similar deletions with group 2 coronaviruses in the C-terminus.

== See also ==
- Murinae
- Zoonosis
