= Bat coronavirus HKU10 =

Virus classification
- (unranked): Virus
- Realm: Riboviria
- Kingdom: Orthornavirae
- Phylum: Pisuviricota
- Class: Pisoniviricetes
- Order: Nidovirales
- Family: Coronaviridae
- Genus: Alphacoronavirus
- Subgenus: Decacovirus
- Species: Alphacoronavirus rousetti

Species of virus

Bat coronavirus HKU10 (Alphacoronavirus rousetti), also called Rousettus bat coronavirus HKU10, is a species of coronavirus in the genus Alphacoronavirus.
