= Nyctacovirus =

Virus classification
- (unranked): Virus
- Realm: Riboviria
- Kingdom: Orthornavirae
- Phylum: Pisuviricota
- Class: Pisoniviricetes
- Order: Nidovirales
- Family: Coronaviridae
- Genus: Alphacoronavirus
- Subgenus: Nyctacovirus

Species
- See text

Subgenus of viruses

Nyctacovirus is a subgenus of viruses in the genus Alphacoronavirus.

== Species ==
The subgenus consists of the following species, listed by scientific name and followed by the exemplar virus of the species:

- Alphacoronavirus chalinolobi, Alphacoronavirus WA2028
- Alphacoronavirus nyctali, Nyctalus velutinus alphacoronavirus SC-2013
- Alphacoronavirus pipistrelli, Alphacoronavirus bat coronavirus
- Alphacoronavirus tylonycteridis, Tylonycteris bat coronavirus HKU33
