= Setracovirus =

Virus classification
- (unranked): Virus
- Realm: Riboviria
- Kingdom: Orthornavirae
- Phylum: Pisuviricota
- Class: Pisoniviricetes
- Order: Nidovirales
- Family: Coronaviridae
- Genus: Alphacoronavirus
- Subgenus: Setracovirus

Subgenus of viruses

Setracovirus is a subgenus of viruses in the genus Alphacoronavirus.

== Taxonomy ==
The subgenus contains the following species, listed by scientific name and followed by the exemplar virus of the species:

- Alphacoronavirus amsterdamense, Human coronavirus NL63
- Alphacoronavirus triaenopis, NL63-related bat coronavirus
