= White-eye coronavirus HKU16 =

Virus classification
- (unranked): Virus
- Realm: Riboviria
- Kingdom: Orthornavirae
- Phylum: Pisuviricota
- Class: Pisoniviricetes
- Order: Nidovirales
- Family: Coronaviridae
- Genus: Deltacoronavirus
- Subgenus: Buldecovirus
- Species: Deltacoronavirus zosteropis

Species of virus

White-eye coronavirus HKU16 (Deltacoronavirus zosteropis) is a species of coronavirus in the genus Deltacoronavirus.
