= Myotacovirus =

Virus classification
- (unranked): Virus
- Realm: Riboviria
- Kingdom: Orthornavirae
- Phylum: Pisuviricota
- Class: Pisoniviricetes
- Order: Nidovirales
- Family: Coronaviridae
- Genus: Alphacoronavirus
- Subgenus: Myotacovirus
- Species: Alphacoronavirus ricketti

Subgenus of viruses

Myotacovirus is a subgenus of viruses in the genus Alphacoronavirus, consisting of a single species, Alphacoronavirus ricketti.
