= Delta coronavirus =

Delta coronavirus may refer to:

- SARS-CoV-2 Delta variant, a variant of SARS-CoV-2 virus that causes COVID-19
- Deltacoronavirus, a grouping of coronavirus species that affects birds and non-human mammals
