= Herdecovirus =

Virus classification
- (unranked): Virus
- Realm: Riboviria
- Kingdom: Orthornavirae
- Phylum: Pisuviricota
- Class: Pisoniviricetes
- Order: Nidovirales
- Family: Coronaviridae
- Genus: Deltacoronavirus
- Subgenus: Herdecovirus
- Species: Deltacoronavirus nycticoracis

Subgenus of viruses

Herdecovirus is a subgenus of viruses in the genus Deltacoronavirus, consisting of a single species, Night heron coronavirus HKU19 (Deltacoronavirus nycticoracis).
