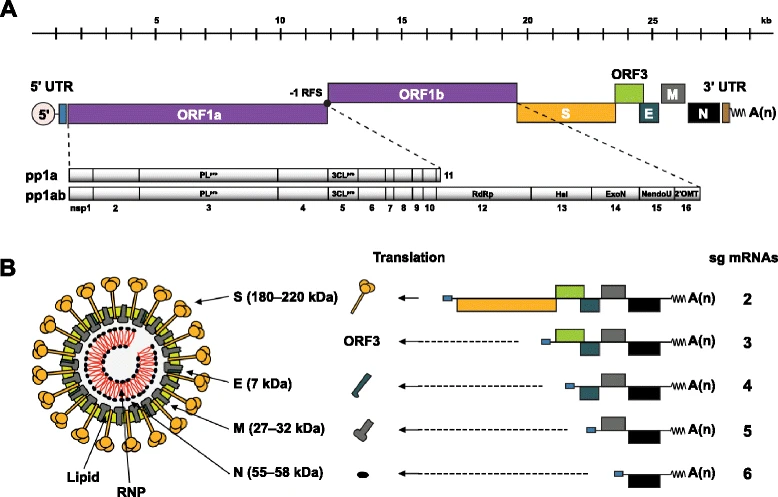
- Porcine epidemic diarrhea virus genome and virion structure

Virus classification
- (unranked): Virus
- Realm: Riboviria
- Kingdom: Orthornavirae
- Phylum: Pisuviricota
- Class: Pisoniviricetes
- Order: Nidovirales
- Family: Coronaviridae
- Genus: Alphacoronavirus
- Subgenus: Pedacovirus

= Pedacovirus =

Subgenus of viruses

Pedacovirus is a subgenus of viruses in the genus Alphacoronavirus.

== Taxonomy ==
The subgenus contains the following species:

- Alphacoronavirus finnoniense
- Alphacoronavirus gouldii, Alphacoronavirus WA1087
- Alphacoronavirus porci, Porcine epidemic diarrhea virus
- Alphacoronavirus scotophili, Scotophilus bat coronavirus 512
