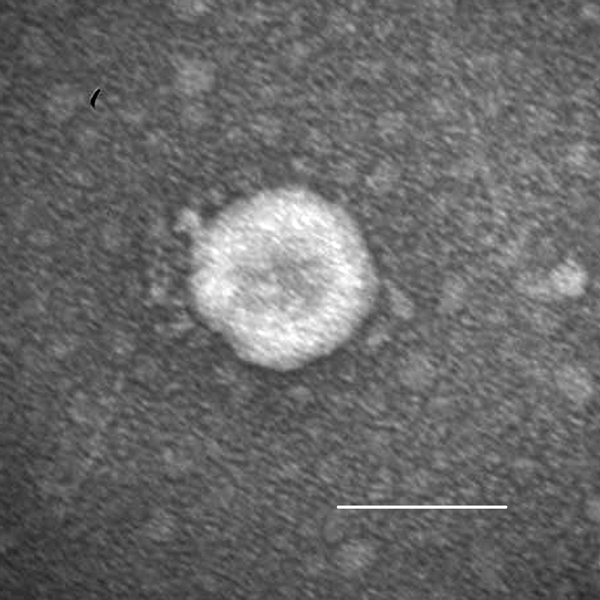
- Electron micrograph of coronavirus HKU15. Scale bar indicates 100 nm.

Virus classification
- (unranked): Virus
- Realm: Riboviria
- Kingdom: Orthornavirae
- Phylum: Pisuviricota
- Class: Pisoniviricetes
- Order: Nidovirales
- Family: Coronaviridae
- Genus: Deltacoronavirus
- Subgenus: Buldecovirus

= Buldecovirus =

Subgenus of viruses

Buldecovirus is a subgenus of viruses in the genus Deltacoronavirus.

== Taxonomy ==
The subgenus contains the following species, listed by scientific name and followed by the exemplar virus of the species:

- Deltacoronavirus gallinulae, Common moorhen coronavirus HKU21
- Deltacoronavirus lonchurae, Munia coronavirus HKU13
- Deltacoronavirus pycnonoti, Bulbul coronavirus HKU11
- Deltacoronavirus suis, Porcine coronavirus HKU15
- Deltacoronavirus zosteropis, White-eye coronavirus HKU16
