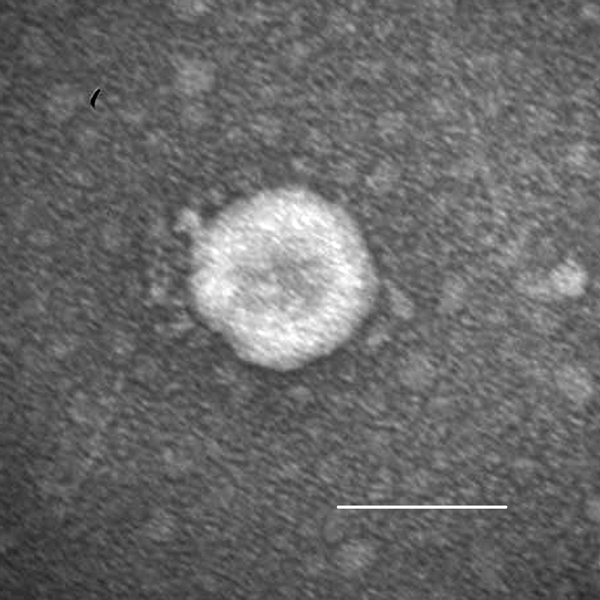
- Electron micrograph of coronavirus HKU15. Scale bar indicates 100 nm.

Virus classification
- (unranked): Virus
- Realm: Riboviria
- Kingdom: Orthornavirae
- Phylum: Pisuviricota
- Class: Pisoniviricetes
- Order: Nidovirales
- Family: Coronaviridae
- Genus: Deltacoronavirus
- Subgenus: Buldecovirus
- Species: Deltacoronavirus suis

Synonyms
- Porcine coronavirus HKU15; Porcine deltacoronavirus; Swine deltacoronavirus

= Coronavirus HKU15 =

Species of virus

Coronavirus HKU15, sometimes called Porcine coronavirus HKU15 (PorCoV HKU15) is a virus first discovered in a surveillance study in Hong Kong, China, and first reported to be associated with porcine diarrhea in February 2014. In February 2014, PorCoV HKU15 was identified in pigs with clinical diarrhea disease in the U.S. state of Ohio. The complete genome of one U.S. strain has been published. Since then, it has been identified in pig farms in Canada. The virus has been referred to as Porcine coronavirus HKU15, Swine deltacoronavirus and Porcine deltacoronavirus.

== See also ==
- Porcine epidemic diarrhea virus
- Alphacoronavirus 1
