= Miniopterus bat coronavirus HKU8 =

Virus classification
- (unranked): Virus
- Realm: Riboviria
- Kingdom: Orthornavirae
- Phylum: Pisuviricota
- Class: Pisoniviricetes
- Order: Nidovirales
- Family: Coronaviridae
- Genus: Alphacoronavirus
- Subgenus: Minunacovirus
- Species: Alphacoronavirus miniopteri

Species of virus

Miniopterus bat coronavirus HKU8 (Bat-CoV HKU8) is an enveloped, single-stranded, positive-sense RNA virus species in the genus Alphacoronavirus that exhibits a corona-like morphology. It causes severe acute respiratory syndrome in bats, but isolates have not been found in humans.

== Genome ==
Coronaviruses are among the largest RNA viruses, possessing complex polyadenylated genomes of 26–32 kb, and are divided into four genera: alpha, beta, gamma, and deltacoronaviruses. The alpha- and betacoronaviruses are derived from the bat gene pool. At least four different, but closely related, alphacoronaviruses (bat-CoV 1A, 1B, HKU7, and HKU8) circulate in bent-winged bats. Coronaviruses in bats are descended from a common ancestor and have been evolving within these hosts over a long period.

A significant percentage of newly emerging viruses are RNA viruses, likely due to the higher nucleotide mutation rate of RNA viruses compared to DNA viruses.

== Habitat ==
The common bent-wing bat is ubiquitous around the world and can be found in the following countries: Afghanistan, Albania, Algeria, Armenia, Australia, Austria, Azerbaijan, Bosnia and Herzegovina, Bulgaria, Cameroon, China, Croatia, Dominican Republic, possibly Ethiopia, France, Georgia, Gibraltar, Greece, Guinea, Hungary, India, Indonesia, Iran, Iraq, Israel, Italy, Japan, Jordan, possibly Kenya, North Korea, South Korea, Laos, Lebanon, Liberia, Libya, Malaysia, Malta, Montenegro, Morocco, Myanmar, Nepal, Nigeria, North Macedonia, Pakistan, Palestine, Papua New Guinea, Philippines, Portugal, Romania, Russian Federation, San Marino, Saudi Arabia, Serbia, Sierra Leone, Slovakia, Slovenia, Solomon Islands, Spain, Sri Lanka, Switzerland, Syria, Taiwan, Tajikistan, Thailand, Tunisia, Turkey, Turkmenistan, Vietnam, and Yemen.

== See also ==
- Common bent-wing bat
- Severe acute respiratory syndrome (SARS)
