= Rhinolophus ferrumequinum alphacoronavirus HuB-2013 =

Virus classification
- (unranked): Virus
- Realm: Riboviria
- Kingdom: Orthornavirae
- Phylum: Pisuviricota
- Class: Pisoniviricetes
- Order: Nidovirales
- Family: Coronaviridae
- Genus: Alphacoronavirus
- Subgenus: Decacovirus
- Species: Alphacoronavirus ferrumequini

Species of virus

Rhinolophus ferrumequinum alphacoronavirus HuB-2013 (Alphacoronavirus ferrumequini) is a species of coronavirus in the genus Alphacoronavirus.
