= Rhinolophus bat coronavirus HKU2 =

Virus classification
- (unranked): Virus
- Realm: Riboviria
- Kingdom: Orthornavirae
- Phylum: Pisuviricota
- Class: Pisoniviricetes
- Order: Nidovirales
- Family: Coronaviridae
- Genus: Alphacoronavirus
- Subgenus: Rhinacovirus
- Species: Alphacoronavirus rhinolophi

Species of virus

Rhinolophus bat coronavirus HKU2 (Chinese horseshoe bat virus; Bat-CoV HKU2) is a novel enveloped, single-stranded positive-sense RNA virus species in the Alphacoronavirus, or Group 1, genus with a corona-like morphology.

== Genome ==
RH-BAT-Cov-HKU2 shares a common evolutionary origin in the spike protein of Bat-SARS CoV. This spike protein shares similar deletions with group 2 coronaviruses in the C-terminus.

== See also ==
- Murinae
- Zoonosis
