= Bulbul coronavirus HKU11 =

Virus classification
- (unranked): Virus
- Realm: Riboviria
- Kingdom: Orthornavirae
- Phylum: Pisuviricota
- Class: Pisoniviricetes
- Order: Nidovirales
- Family: Coronaviridae
- Genus: Deltacoronavirus
- Subgenus: Buldecovirus
- Species: Deltacoronavirus pycnonoti

Species of virus

Bulbul coronavirus HKU11 (Bulbul-CoV HKU11) is a positive-sense single-stranded RNA Deltacoronavirus of avian origin found in Chinese bulbuls.
