= Letovirinae =

Virus classification
- (unranked): Virus
- Realm: Riboviria
- Kingdom: Orthornavirae
- Phylum: Pisuviricota
- Class: Pisoniviricetes
- Order: Nidovirales
- Family: Coronaviridae
- Subfamily: Letovirinae

Lower taxa
- Genus: Alphaletovirus; Subgenus: Milecovirus; Species: Alphaletovirus microhylae

Subfamily of viruses

Letovirinae is a subfamily of viruses within the family Coronaviridae, where it is the only subfamily besides the more diverse Orthocoronavirinae (coronaviruses). Letovirinae contains one genus, Alphaletovirus, which contains one subgenus, Milecovirus, which contains one species, Microhyla letovirus 1 (MLeV, Alphaletovirus microhylae). This species was discovered in 2018 and is hosted by the ornate chorus frog (Microhyla fissipes).

Other unaccepted species in the Letovirinae have been discovered in Pacific salmon (Oncorhynchus), and in Murray River carp (Cyprinus).
