= Mambalgins =

Toxin found in black mambas

Mambalgin-1
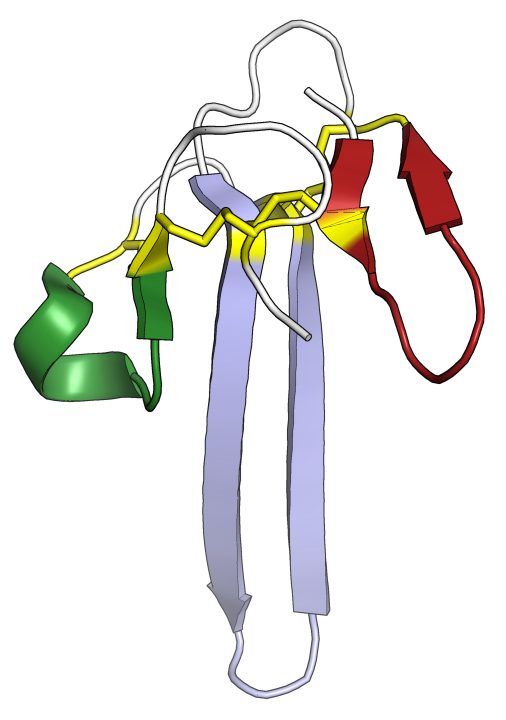
- The structure of mambalgin-1, showing the three "finger" loops in red (loop I), blue (loop II), and green (loop III), with core disulfide bonds highlighted in yellow.

Identifiers
- Organism: Dendroaspis polylepis polylepis
- Symbol: ?
- PDB: 5DU1
- UniProt: P0DKR6
Search for
- Structures: Swiss-model
- Domains: InterPro

Mambalgin-2

Identifiers
- Organism: Dendroaspis polylepis polylepis
- Symbol: ?
- PDB: 2MFA
- UniProt: P0DKS3
Search for
- Structures: Swiss-model
- Domains: InterPro

Mambalgin-3

Identifiers
- Organism: Dendroaspis angusticeps
- Symbol: ?
- UniProt: C0HJB0
Search for
- Structures: Swiss-model
- Domains: InterPro

Mambalgins are peptides found in the venom of the black mamba (Dendroaspis polylepis polylepis), an elapid snake. Mambalgins are members of the three-finger toxin (3FTx) protein family and have the characteristic three-finger protein fold. First reported by French researchers in 2012, mambalgins are unusual members of the 3FTx family in that they have the in vivo effect of causing analgesia without apparent toxicity. Their mechanism of action is potent inhibition of acid-sensing ion channels.

== Structure ==
Mambalgins known to date consist of 57 amino acid residues and fold into a characteristic three-finger toxin (3FTx) structure. Two isoforms were originally described, called mambalgin-1 and mambalgin-2, which differ by a single amino acid residue. A third variant which differs by a single residue at another site, has subsequently been reported from venom profiling of the Eastern green mamba (Dendroaspis augusticeps).

The X-ray structure of mambalgin-1 has been solved and consists of a three-finger protein fold with the typical three beta sheet-containing "finger" loops emanating from a central core stabilized by disulphide bonds; however, the structure differs from most 3FTx proteins in having an elongated second loop and shortened first and third loops. Mambalgins have relatively low sequence similarity to other 3FTx proteins and are most closely related to the 3FTx subclass known as the non-conventional or "weak" toxins.

Human acid-sensing ion channel 1a inhibition (hASIC1aΔC) by snake toxin mambalgin1 develops a complex of three hASIC1aΔC subunits with six 6 NAG ligands (2 per subunit). The PDB code of this complex is 7CFT. Each hASIC1aΔC subunit is composed of an acid-sensing ion channel and a mambalgin1. Mambalgin1 is the toxin within hASIC1aΔC and is present in each subunit. The trimeric hASIC1aΔC shows a canonical chalice-like structure where each subunit of hASIC1aΔC harbors a cysteine-rich extracellular domain (ECD). By binding to the ASIC's ECD, mambalgin prevents the ECD from opening in response to a drop in pH from the venom, and prevents the ASICs from functioning.

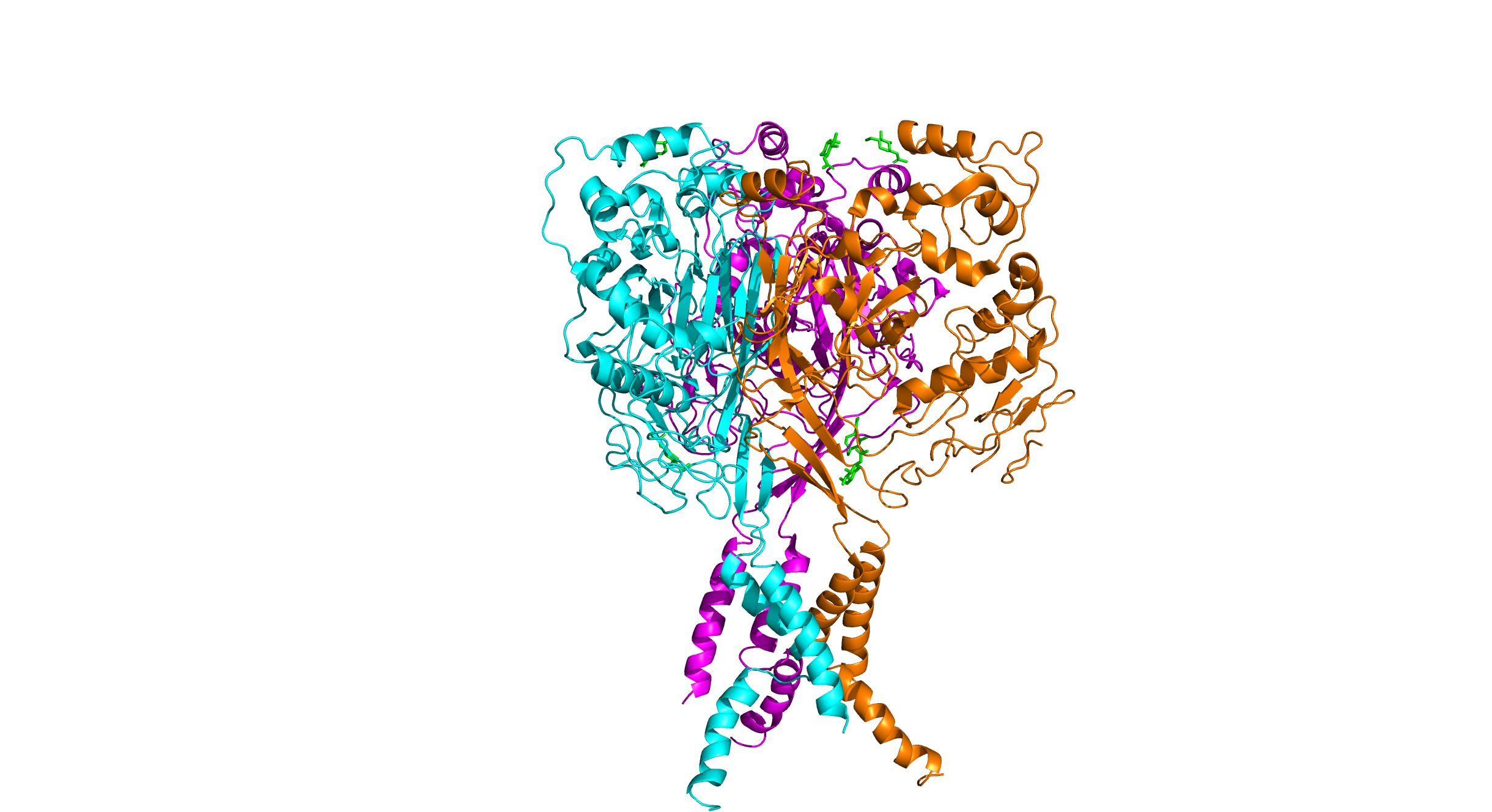
Structure of toxin Mambalgin1 and Acid-sensing ion channels (ASICs). The three hASIC1aΔC subunits are colored orange, cyan, and pink, and the six 6 NAG ligands (2 per subunit) are green. The PDB code of this complex is 7CFT.

Mambalgin1 binding to hASIC1aΔC induces a conformational change in Finger-II of Mamba1. The significant residues from hASIC1aΔC in this interaction are Asp347, Asp351, and Phe352 on the α5 helix of the thumb domain. These residues interact with Phe27 and Arg28 on Mambalgin1, likely forming salt bridges and causing the hASIC1aΔC residues to flip outward from the acidic pocket. This change is significant as the tip region of Finger-II flips to the thumb domain of hASIC1aΔC to facilitate the interaction between the toxin and the channel.

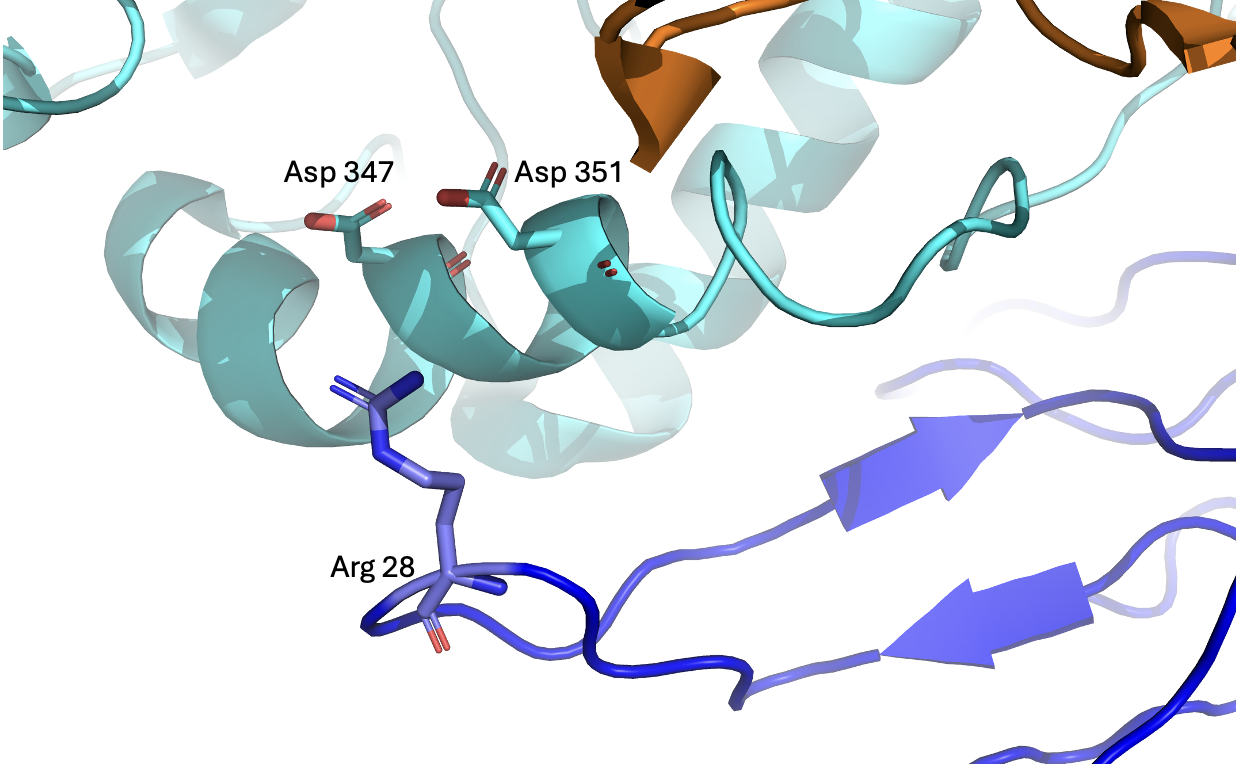
Binding interaction site of Mambalgin1 (dark blue) and ASICs (cyan)

== Function ==
Mambalgins are potent inhibitors of acid-sensing ion channels (ASICs), which are multimeric membrane proteins that respond to low pH and whose activation is thought to be involved in perception of pain. Mambalgins have been shown to interact specifically with ASIC subtypes present in the central nervous system (homomeric ASIC1a and heteromeric ASIC1a/ASIC2a or ASIC1a/ASIC2b), as well as those found in sensory neurons (ASIC1b and ASIC1a/ASIC1b). They have no effect on other ASICs or on other types of ion channel proteins. These interactions are likely mediated in part by mambalgins' positive electrostatic potential facilitating binding to negatively charged ASICs. Mambalgins are believed to trap ASICs in a closed conformation.

In tests performed on laboratory mice, mambalgins have the in vivo effect of analgesia without the toxic effects seen with most 3FTx proteins, and in particular, without the clinical manifestations associated with inhibition of nicotinic acetylcholine receptors, the targets of most 3FTx proteins including mambalgins' closest relatives. Furthermore, the analgesic effects of mambalgins does not confer side effects such as respiratory depression and drug tolerance, both associated with opioid analgesics.

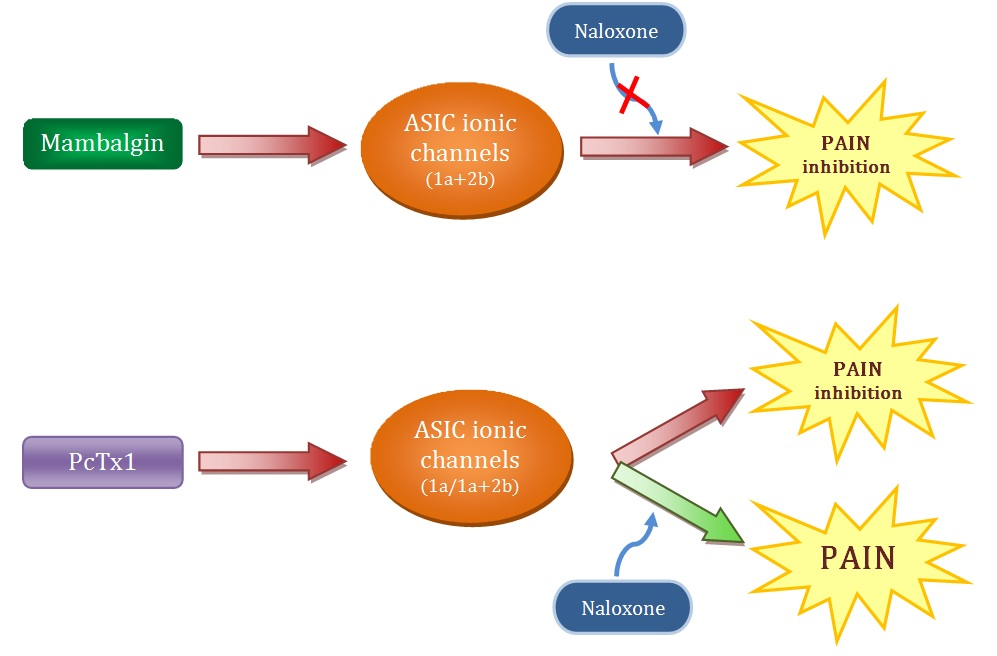
Summary of the different pathways that mambalgins and PcTx1 follow (non-opioid and opioid pathways)

In addition to mambalgins, at least three other peptides from three different taxa have been identified as interacting with ASICs: PcTx1, from the South American tarantula Psalmopoeus cambridgei; APETx2, from the sea anemone Anthopleura elegantissima; and MitTx, a heterodimer from the snake Micrurus tener tener. PcTx1 and APETx2, like mambalgins, are ASIC inhibitors, albeit with different subtype specificities; MitTx is an activator associated with causing pain in vivo. The four proteins have no detectable sequence similarity. The natural function of ASIC-inhibiting analgesic peptides is unclear, as all are produced by predator animals yet have no known toxic effects on the corresponding prey.

== Applications ==
In laboratory experiments using laboratory mice, mambalgins appear to exert clinically significant analgesic effects without the side effects typically associated with opioid analgesics. Although this property has attracted interest as a basis for development of pharmaceutical drugs, mambalgins or their derivatives are not in clinical use.
