= Minacovirus =

Virus classification
- (unranked): Virus
- Realm: Riboviria
- Kingdom: Orthornavirae
- Phylum: Pisuviricota
- Class: Pisoniviricetes
- Order: Nidovirales
- Family: Coronaviridae
- Genus: Alphacoronavirus
- Subgenus: Minacovirus
- Species: Alphacoronavirus neovisontis

Subgenus of viruses

Minacovirus is a subgenus of viruses in the genus Alphacoronavirus. The subgenus contains one species: Alphacoronavirus neovisontis. The exemplar virus of the species in Mink coronavirus.
