= Acid-sensing ion channel =

Class of transport proteins

Acid-sensing sodium channel
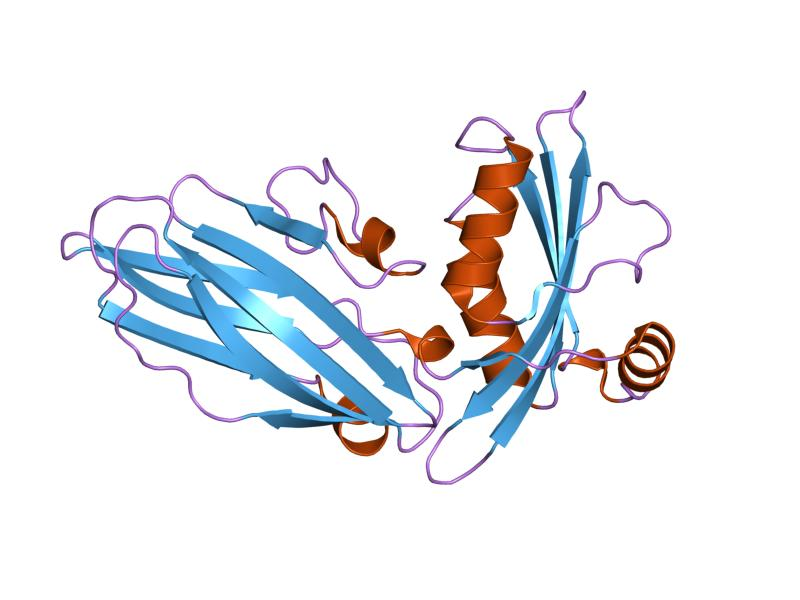
- Structure of acid-sensing ion channel 1.

Identifiers
- Symbol: ASC
- Pfam: PF00858
- InterPro: IPR001873
- PROSITE: PDOC00926
- SCOP2: 2qts / SCOPe / SUPFAM
- TCDB: 1.A.6
- OPM superfamily: 181
- OPM protein: 4fz1
Available protein structures:
- PDB: IPR001873 PF00858 (ECOD; PDBsum)
- AlphaFold: IPR001873; PF00858

Acid-sensing ion channels (ASICs) are neuronal voltage-insensitive sodium channels activated by extracellular protons. ASIC1 also shows low Ca^{2+} permeability. ASIC proteins are a subfamily of the ENaC/Deg superfamily of ion channels. These genes have splice variants that encode for several isoforms that are marked by a suffix. In mammals, acid-sensing ion channels (ASIC) are encoded by five genes that produce ASIC protein subunits: ASIC1, ASIC2, ASIC3, ASIC4, and ASIC5. Three of these protein subunits assemble to form the ASIC, which can combine into both homotrimeric and heterotrimeric channels typically found in both the central nervous system and peripheral nervous system. However, the most common ASICs are homotrimeric ASIC1a (an isoform of ASIC1) and heterotrimeric ASIC1a/2a (where ASIC2a is an isoform of ASIC2) and homotrimeric ASIC3. ASIC2b is non-functional on its own but modulates channel activity when participating in heteromultimers and ASIC4 has no known function. On a broad scale, ASICs are potential drug targets due to their involvement in pathological states such as retinal damage, seizures, and ischemic brain injury.

== Structure ==
Crystallized structure of Acid-sensing ion channel

Each acid-sensing ion channel is composed of a 500-560 amino acid sequence, which is constructed into a six transmembrane segment—two per subunit (TMD1 and TMD2), a cytoplasmic amino-carboxyl termini, and a large extracellular domain. The intracellular amino-carboxyl termini domains are vital to the channel's intracellular protein interactions and modulations, ion permeability, and gating. However, the gating and mechanics of each acid-sensing ion channel is determined by the combination of ASIC subunits that form its structure.

=== Pore ===
The mechanics of the pore function are fundamental to the channel's structure. Between the three ASIC1 subunits, a tunnel extends from the top of the extracellular domains to the cytoplasm of the cell. The central tunnel runs directly between the trimeric unit, where it has large constricted areas that change in size and shape depending on channel state.

The two transmembrane domains (TMD1 and TMD2) of each of the three ASIC subunits are responsible for the channel's pore. TMD2 is primarily involved with lining of the lumen within the pore and inactivation gate of the channel, where as TMD1 holds the protein within the cell's lipid bilayer. TMD1 is connected to the β-sheets of the extracellular domain that flex to widen the extracellular domain to allow for ion passage through the channel. In-between the TMD2 segments resides a selectivity filter that forms the narrowest part of the pore, which is responsible for ASIC permissibility to mostly Na^{+}. For ASIC1, nine amino acid residues, three contributed by each ASIC subunit (Gly443, Ala444, Ser445), form the selectivity filter. Nicknamed the "GAS belt", all three carbonyl oxygens line the pore, producing a negative potential that contributes to the conductance of cations. The specific amino acid residue of aspartate on the extracellular side lumen of TMD2 in ASIC1 has been linked to the channel's low Ca^{2+} conductance. Additionally, The n-termini residues of the transmembrane region has also shown selectivity for Na^{+}, since mutations within this region has altered function and of Na^{+} conductance.

=== Extracellular region ===
ASIC's have a large, fist-like extracellular region that consumes most of the proteins structure. Within its "fist-like" structure there is a wrist, palm, finger, knuckle, thumb and β-ball domains. The "palm" makes up most of the extracellular domain, formed by seven β-sheets, where as the rest of the secondary structural domains are composed of α-helical segments. Distinguished by its specific amino acid configurations, the extracellular region is fundamental to the induction of activation/inactivation along with pH gating. The specific β-sheet loop area between the "palm" and "thumb" domains has shown involvement in the signal transduction from the extracellular domain to the transmembrane regions, resulting in a conformational change of the ASIC to its open state. However, it remains fairly inconclusive of which particular residues interact with protons to activate the channel. In 2009, studies may have established a relationship between the aromatic residues Tyr72, Pro287, and Trp288 and proton-gating of the ASIC. These residues form an acidic pocket that express electrostatic potentials that are responsible for pH-dependency in channel activation and modulation. This pocket in the extracellular domain acts as a reserve for cations to concentrate to further assist in Na^{+} influx. Glycosylation is also apparent within the extracellular region, playing an important role in the trafficking the channel to the membrane's surface as well as establishing the ASIC's sensitivity to pH levels. Further experimental evidence has indicated that Ca^{2+} may also play a pivotal role in modulating proton affinity of ASIC gating both within the pore and on the extracellular domain.

== Function ==
The role of the ASIC is to sense reduced levels of extracellular pH and result in a response or signal from the neuron. The ligand that binds to the activation site has long been thought to be exclusively protons; however, recent studies have shown that ASIC4 and ASIC1 can be activated at normal pH levels, indicating other types of ligand binders. Under increased acidic conditions, a proton binds to the channel in the extracellular region, activating the ion channel to go through conformational change therefore opening transmembrane domain 2 (TMD2). This results in the influx of sodium ions through the lumen of TMD2. All ASICs are specifically permeable to sodium ions. The only variant is ASIC1a which also has a low permeability to calcium ions. The influx of these cations results in membrane depolarization. Voltage-gated Ca^{2+} channels are activated resulting in an influx of calcium into the cell. This causes depolarization of the neuron and an excitatory response released. In ASIC1a, Ca^{2+} increase inside the cell is a result of calcium influx directly through the channel.

Once activated the ASIC can go on to trigger multitudes of different effector proteins and signaling molecules to result in different reactions from the cell. Namely, α-Actinin results in heightened pH sensitivity and desensitization recovery. They can also increase current flow density through the channel. There are also many protein kinases that regulate ASIC function through phosphorylation. These include protein kinase A (PKA) and protein kinase C (PKC). There are thought to be many more regulators, yet their effects have not been experimentally concluded.

There are some other factors that can play a role on the regulation of the ASICs. The presence of matured N-linked glycans on the surface of the channel is said to allow the channel to preferentially traffic for ASIC1a. This is a result from the increased N-glycosylation sites on ASIC1a and ASIC2a. The high levels of glycerol (known to expedite protein maturation) on ASIC2 surface also aids in the implication that regulation of these channels' function is reliant on protein maturation. It is also hypothesized that oxidation plays a role in trafficking.

== Location ==
Most ASIC are expressed in the nervous system. ASIC1, ASIC2, ASIC2b, and ASIC4 are commonly expressed in both the central and peripheral nervous system, while ASIC1b and ASIC3 are typically only located in the peripheral.

In the peripheral nervous system, ASICs are located within the cell bodies of postsynaptic membranes and sensory nerve terminals. Additionally, ASICs are typically found in afferent nerve fibers of the skin, muscles, joints, and viscera, where they have been discovered to be associated with pain, taste, and gastrointestinal functions.

In the central nervous system ASIC's are usually found in the dorsal horn of the spinal cord. ASIC1 is specifically concentrated in the amygdala, illustrating its role in anxious behavior and ASIC3 has been found in the organ of Corti and spiral ganglion illustrating this specific channel's role in auditory and vision perception. Subunits ASIC1a, ASIC2a and ASIC2b have also been found in the hippocampus.

== Physiology ==
ASICs are potential drug targets for treating a wide variety of conditions linked to both the CNS and PNS. Of particular interest to pain field is the ASIC3 subtype receptor, which is specifically expressed in nociceptors. This subtype exhibits a biphasic current upon proton activation, where the initial inward Na^{+} current is shortly followed by a sustained cationic current.

ASICs are important in retinal function and offer protection in response to bright light. The susceptibility of retinal damage is increased after deletion of the ASIC2 gene. Increased apoptosis occurred in response to bright light in an ASIC2 -/- gene compared to wild type retina.

ASIC1a channels also play a role in protection against seizure activity. Seizures cause increased, uncontrolled neuronal activity in the brain that releases large quantities of acidic vesicles. ASIC1a channels open in response and have shown to protect against seizures by reducing their progression. Studies researching this phenomenon have found that deleting the ASIC1a gene resulted in amplified seizure activity.

ASIC1a channels specifically open in response to pH 5.0-6.9 and contribute to the pathology of ischemic brain injury because their activation causes a small increase in Ca^{2+}permeability and an inward flow of Ca^{2+}. ASIC1a channels additionally facilitate the activation of voltage-gated Ca2+ channels and NMDA receptor channels upon initial depolarization, contributing to the major increase in intracellular calcium that results in cell death. A possible mechanism of ASIC1a channel-mediated cell death is due to the activation of other channels, leading to elevated Ca^{2+} which creates signaling pathways for apoptosis and necrosis in the cell. Gene knockout studies as well as ASIC blockades have shown to reduce brain infarct volume by as much as 60%, suggesting ASIC channels play a major role in the development of the pathological states resulting from acidosis and ischemia induced neuronal injury. The effects of both ASIC and NMDA blockades have been studied to determine the roles of both channels in Ca^{2+} toxicity and assess their respective contributions. The use of blockade for both channels provides greater neuroprotection than using a blockade for just one channel, and the ASIC blockade creates prolonged effectiveness of the NMDA blockade.

== Pharmacology ==
Due to the role of acid sensing ion channels in pain perception and several pathophysiological processes, they have a pharmacological significance as a drug target for inhibition. Acid sensing ion channels are found in both central and peripheral neurons. Modulation of ASIC activity may additionally control the adverse behavioral and emotional symptoms of chronic pain such as anxiety and depression.

Acid sensing ion channels (ASIC) are observed to be activated at pH's under ~6 with variability depending on the type of channel and its location. A decrease in pH may be due to a variety of reasons including tissue inflammation, ischemic stroke, an accumulation of lactic acid due to increased cellular metabolism. Activation of the channel causes increased permeability of sodium ions which depolarizes the cell and induces the firing of an action potential. The resulting action potentials may be modulated through small molecule inhibitors.

Amiloride is an example of an ASIC inhibitor, while not considered highly potent due to an IC50 value in the micromolar range, has allowed for studies on ASIC inhibition effects on migraines. During a migraine, cortical spreading depression is observed which causes ion imbalances and the release of charged molecules which may activate ASIC. Testing of amiloride in rodents, showed a decrease in the cortical spreading depression during a migraine. Studies showed that amiloride acts as a competitive inhibitor of the ASIC chapters. The use of amiloride also showed side effects in rodents due to inhibition of sodium/ calcium exchangers. The inhibition of these exchangers disrupts cellular calcium homeostasis and causes high levels of calcium in the cell which explains the reduced neuroprotective efficacy with the use of amiloride. The findings that have come through due to ASIC inhibition by amiloride are promising and support the therapeutic potential. However, due to amiloride's lack of specificity and potency, further drug development on its structure will need to be done before a drug can be released.

A small molecule inhibitor, A-317567, shows more therapeutic potential than amiloride with a higher specificity to ASIC channels and increased potency. Although A-317567 shows little selectivity for the different kinds of ASIC channels, in vivo findings showed that the side-effects seen with amiloride use are avoided due to A-317567's specificity for ASIC. Additionally, A-317567 has the ability to maintain inhibition of sustained currents which could be promising specifically in acidosis-mediated chronic conditions.

The most effective and best-known inhibitor of ASICs is PcTX1. PcTX1 specifically inhibits ASICa and has an IC50 value in the nanomolar range- a smaller IC50 than all other known ASIC inhibitors which have been in the micromolar range. In addition, PcTX1 does not inhibit other voltage-gated ion channels or ligand-gated channels. The structure of this inhibitor is 40 amino acids linked with disulfide bonds. It was identified as a peptide toxin from the South American tarantula Psalmopoeus Cambridge. When PcTX1 was administered within the basolateral amygdala of rats, the emotion and anxiety related symptoms associated with pain were significantly decreased. Mambalgins isolated from the venom of the black mamba have also been identified as potent inhibitors of ASICs.

Hi1a is a peptide from the venom Hadronyche infensa (the K’gari funnel web spider) which inhibits ASIC1a and has been used in rodent models to reduce myocardial ischemia.

Commonly used non-steroid anti-inflammatory drugs (NSAIDs) have been found to play a role in ASIC inhibition which contributes to pain modulation. The well-known mechanism for NSAID function is their inhibition of prostaglandin synthesis, a major inflammatory compound. However, findings show that NSAIDs ibuprofen and aspirin inhibit ASICs with IC50 values of 350μM and 260μM, respectively. NSAIDs likely inhibit the ASIC current during acute pain, particularly that caused by tissue inflammation, and thus inhibit the signal to pain-sensing neurons.

By furthering research on the pharmacological potential in ASIC inhibition, patients suffering with chronic pain and various pathologies associated with acidosis may have greater treatment options in the future. Additionally, drug discovery studies of ASICs provide greater knowledge on the function of the channels themselves and their physiological significance.
