= Porcine epidemic diarrhoea =

Medical condition affecting pigs

Porcine epidemic diarrhea is a condition caused by the porcine epidemic diarrhea virus that leads to severe gastrointestinal disease in pigs.

It is closely related to the agent responsible for transmissible gastroenteritis in pigs. Piglets are most susceptible to the disease, as are young adults during periods of stress. Transmission is via the fecal-oral route.

The porcine epidemic diarrhea virus belongs to the family Coronaviridae, and it only affects pigs. PED is harmless to other farm animals and poses no food safety risk. The virus is enveloped, single-stranded, and has a positive sense RNA. The epithelial cells of the small intestine are the target of the virus, causing severe diarrhea and dehydration. However, when endemic, PED exhibit lower morbidity in suckling and recently weaned piglets.

== History ==
PED is closely related to the agent responsible for transmissible gastroenteritis in pigs. Transmission is via the fecal-oral route and by aerosols. The first case of PED was seen in the United Kingdom in 1971. By the early 1980s, it began circulating to other European countries. Porcine epidemic diarrhea has been endemic in Europe and Asia but not reported in the United States until spring 2013. However, recently, PED has been identified in various herds across multiple states in the U.S. The U.S. PED strains underwent evolutionary divergence, which resulted in two sublineages. The three emergent U.S. strains are most closely related to a strain isolated in 2012 from China, which might result from multiple recombination events between different genetic lineages or sublineages of PED.

== Infection route ==
PED targets intestinal epithelial cells and replicates in the small intestine villi. Infected pigs show reduced intestinal villus height and decreased transepithelial resistance.Trypsin facilitates PED entry and release by cleaving the S protein into two subunits, enabling efficient viral replication and spreading in vitro. However, some cell-adapted attenuated PED strains can support PED reproduction without trypsin. As a result of viral infection, distinct cytopathic effects, including cell fusion, vacuolation, syncytium, and detachment, are produced in infected cells. Once in the body, PED promotes fusion between cells, resulting in continuous cell necrosis, severe diarrhea, and even death in piglets. At the same time, PED is sensitive to the porcine liver, resulting in abnormal cholesterol metabolism genes and thus disrupting the metabolic homeostasis of cholesterol. PED uses endocytosis as the entry mechanism for infecting host cells. The virus relies on serine proteolysis and low pH to invade cells. Following entry, PED utilizes viral components to evade innate immune responses. Extensive research has shown that interferon plays a vital role as a signaling molecule to block viral infection upon invasion.

== Signs and symptoms ==
In adult swine, the disease is very mild and mortality is rare. The primary signs are a watery diarrhea and mild systemic signs such as pyrexia, anorexia and lethargy.

The virus presents itself differently in the ages of swine. However, weaners and growers exhibit profuse, watery diarrhea that lacks blood or mucus, is typically yellow-green, and is accompanied by vomiting and anorexia. It may lead to a 100% mortality rate of piglets under a week of age. In piglets, excessive scouring, diarrhea, vomiting, dehydration, and increased pre-wean mortality are primary indicators. The incubation period is typically two to four days; clinical signs occur within four days when PED first enters the herd.

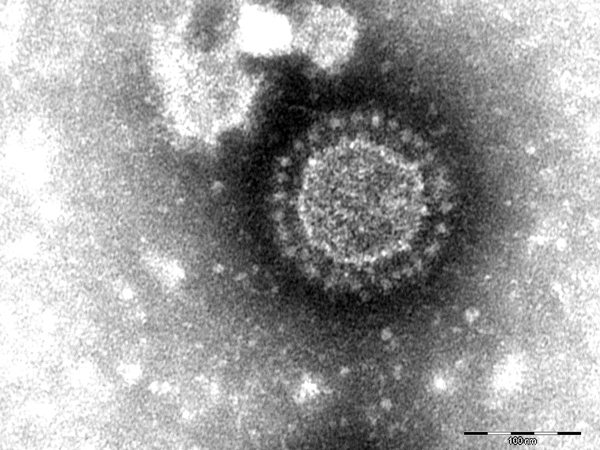
Porcine Epidemic Virus under electron microscope

=== Clinical signs ===
The clinical signs vary widely and depend on previous exposure and the immunological and endemic status of the infected area, including the farm and region. The initial clinical finding is watery feces that may be coagulated, malodorous, and can accompanied by vomiting. Dehydration and metabolic acidosis may be secondary signs. If swine recovers, it is usually within 7 to 10 days. Some conducted studies in the United States and the United Kingdom suggest that the incubation period of PED is well before clinical signs are detected and can range from 1 to 7 days (US PED) or 5–8 days (UK PED).

=== Clinical symptoms ===
A common symptom of PED is gross lesions, which are limited to the digestive tract. Gross lesions are characterized by thin, transparent intestinal walls that accumulate considerable amounts of yellow fluid within the lumen. The stomach is filled with curdled milk, most likely a side effect of the reduced intestinal peristalsis. The virus infects many areas of the digestive tract; congestion of the mesenteric vessels is frequently detected with infection, along with fluid-filled mesenteric lymph nodes. Infected pigs commonly exhibit a lack of intestinal lacteals, which serves as an indicator of malabsorption. Despite persistent severe diarrhea, infected pigs had low to moderate appetite 3–5 days after the onset of diarrhea, after which they began to decline.

Histological lesions are another symptom seen in piglets infected with PED. These lesions consist of acute diffuse, severe atrophic enteritis, mild vacuolation of superficial epithelial cells, and sub-epithelial edema in the cecum and colon. In various studies during incubation, infected pigs exhibited standard villous lengths; however, the vacuolated enterocytes underwent necrosis. After the onset of diarrhea, infected pigs showed severe villous shortening for 1–3 days. Piglets euthanized at a later stage of infection had moderate to severe villous atrophy, which is indicative of continued cellular necrosis. Following PED infection, markers for proliferating cells are seen. One study concluded that the time of onset and severity of diarrhea induced by PED may vary depending on the extent of villous atrophy and the rapidity of replacement by the stem cells.

== Diagnosis ==
Diagnosis is via immunofluorescence or immunohistochemistry, and ELISA can detect antigen or antibodies in the blood based on the history, clinical signs in the different age groups, and examination of fecal samples/dead piglets for evidence of PED via laboratory diagnosis.

Since signs of the PED infection are clinically and pathologically indistinguishable from those caused by Transmissible gastroenteritis virus. PED diagnosis cannot be made purely on the basis of clinical signs and histopathological lesions. Therefore, differential diagnosis to demonstrate the presence of PED and its antigens must be conducted in the laboratory. ]PCR is performed on the feces and intestinal lining of pigs with acute PED to reliably detect the infection. Several serologic tests are an alternative pathway to demonstrate rising antibody titer to PED. Paired serum samples should be collected upon the first onset of diarrhea and the second no sooner than four weeks later.

=== Methods ===
Due to the fast turnaround times and sensitivity, conventional and real-time RT-PCR systems are available as commercial kits, they are most widely utilized for PED detection during epidemic or endemic outbreaks. Nucleotide sequencing of the S gene region may help determine the genotype of PED circulating in herds. Due to passive immunization for neonatal piglets against PED, determining the presence or absence of anti-PED antibodies may be aimless in sow herds. Instead, measuring quantities of neutralizing antibodies against PED or against the S protein in serum and colostrum should be necessary to monitor the immunity level following sow immunization. In this regard, virus neutralization tests could be essential for estimating levels of protective antibodies piglets receive from sows. However, this method is time-consuming and cannot selectively detect only secretory IgA antibodies representing mucosal immunity. In contrast, immunofluorescence and ELISA approaches for antibody detection are equally specific but less time-consuming and more accessible than the virus neutralization test. Immunofluorescence and ELISA tests may be inappropriate for detecting protective antibodies regardless of the antigen since they can only detect exposure due to natural infection or vaccination. However, these tools help monitor endemic situations with PED infection in affected farms by determining infection status in weaned and finished pigs.

== Virology ==
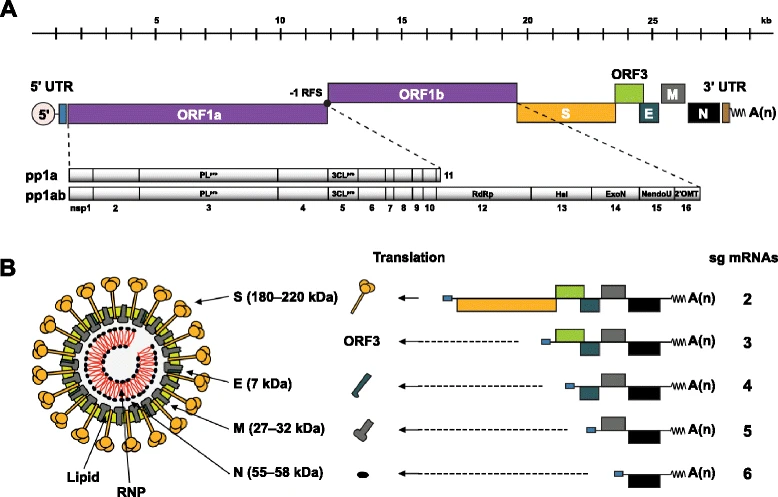
Mechanism of viral entry for PED

Researchers are still in the process of developing effective vaccines against PED. In order to develop an effective vaccine, the genomic makeup and function of the virus need to be well understood. Additionally, understanding how innate immunity is influenced by viral components is necessary for vaccine development. PED's genome is estimated to be 28 kb and arranged in the order of the 5' untranslated regions; it contains an open reading frame, spike protein, accessory proteins, envelope protein, membrane protein, nucleocapsid protein, 3' UTR, and the poly-A tail. In addition to these proteins, the S protein is a type I glycoprotein and a receptor-binding protein with two subunits (S1 and S2). The S protein is crucial for viral entry, virus-host interactions, and determining immunogenicity evaluation. Each structural and non-structural protein has a dominant role in viral replication, transcription, and translation.

=== Vaccine development ===
Typical PED vaccines are whole-virus vaccines including inactivated and live attenuated vaccines.

There are several advantages to inactivated vaccines, for example, they offer an adequate safety profile and production efficiency. However, the immunogenicity of inactivated vaccines can be altered when they undergo the inactivation process, which often requires multiple doses and booster injections. Live attenuated vaccines are highly immunogenic; however, single immunization is usually sufficient to induce protective immunity. However, the risk of reversion to a virulent wild type is a limiting factor of its applicability. Utilizing low-virulence, high-titer, and highly immunogenic strains is critical to developing potent vaccines. However, the isolation in vitro is enigmatic, namely for pandemic variable strains. To add to the difficulty, even if the strains are isolated successfully, there is no guarantee they will have high titers.

Researchers have begun to modify PED strains with reduced viral virulence but high immunogenicity by utilizing reverse genetic operating systems to develop live attenuated vaccines. Although the cycle of developing inactivated vaccines is quick, the immunogenicity is poor. Live attenuated vaccines possess adequate immunogenicity but poor security and a lengthy development cycle. To combine the positive attributes of both vaccine types, nucleic acid vaccines were developed. The term nucleic acid vaccines includes both DNA and mRNA vaccines. The advantages of such vaccines are high security, short synthesis time, and simple design. Once the platform for the immunization is established, synthesizing and inserting the core neutralizing antigen gene sequence into an appropriate expression vector happens immediately after. However, the bivalent DNA vaccine generated by combining PED with an RV or TGEV has been established but not yet applied to clinical trials, possibly due to the poor immunogenicity. Researchers have improved the effectiveness of DNA vaccines, but some breakthroughs are still required to allow DNA vaccines to play a more prominent role in preventing disease. In contrast, RNA vaccines have excellent application prospects. mRNA vaccines possess higher immune potency but are more unstable in vivo than DNA vaccines.

The reason behind the failure of the current PED vaccines could be the constant variability of the virus and the inability of the vaccines to initiate ample mucosal immunity. The IgA secreted by intestinal mucosal epithelial cells neutralized viruses at the invasion site. Contrarily, lgA present in colostrum plays a crucial role in protecting suckling piglets from PED. Currently, two strategies have been utilized to induce mucosal immunity. As stated in the article, Porcine epidemic diarrhea virus: Molecular mechanisms of attenuation and vaccines, “The first involves suitable carriers for delivering vaccines via mucosal routes; an attenuated strain entrapped in the enteric hydroxypropyl methylcellulose phthalate material successfully induced both mucosal immunity and systemic immunity after oral immunization in weaned piglets. PED-killed vaccine antigens entrapped in PLGA particles were delivered intranasally to sows at 28 and 14 days before farrowing. Pregnant sows immunized with PLGA-KAg had the highest serum lgG and lgA levels, colostrum antibody titers, and the strongest cellular immune response. The second was intramuscularly administrating vaccines with appropriate adjuvants. Recently, researchers have developed an inactivated vaccine that can induce IgA and IgG in 5-week-old pigs only by intramuscular injection of inactivated PED antigen combined with CCL25, CCL27 and CCL28 proteins.”

== Treatment and control ==
Treatment is symptomatic and aims to prevent dehydration in young pigs, using products such as electrolyte and energy supplements. Suitable biosecurity protocols such as adequate quarantine, isolation of cases, and disinfection help prevent entry or spread of the disease in the herd. In Canada, the Canadian Swine Health Board developed detailed protocols on how to adequately disinfect transportation vehicles for live hogs and ensure the quality of the disinfection protocol.

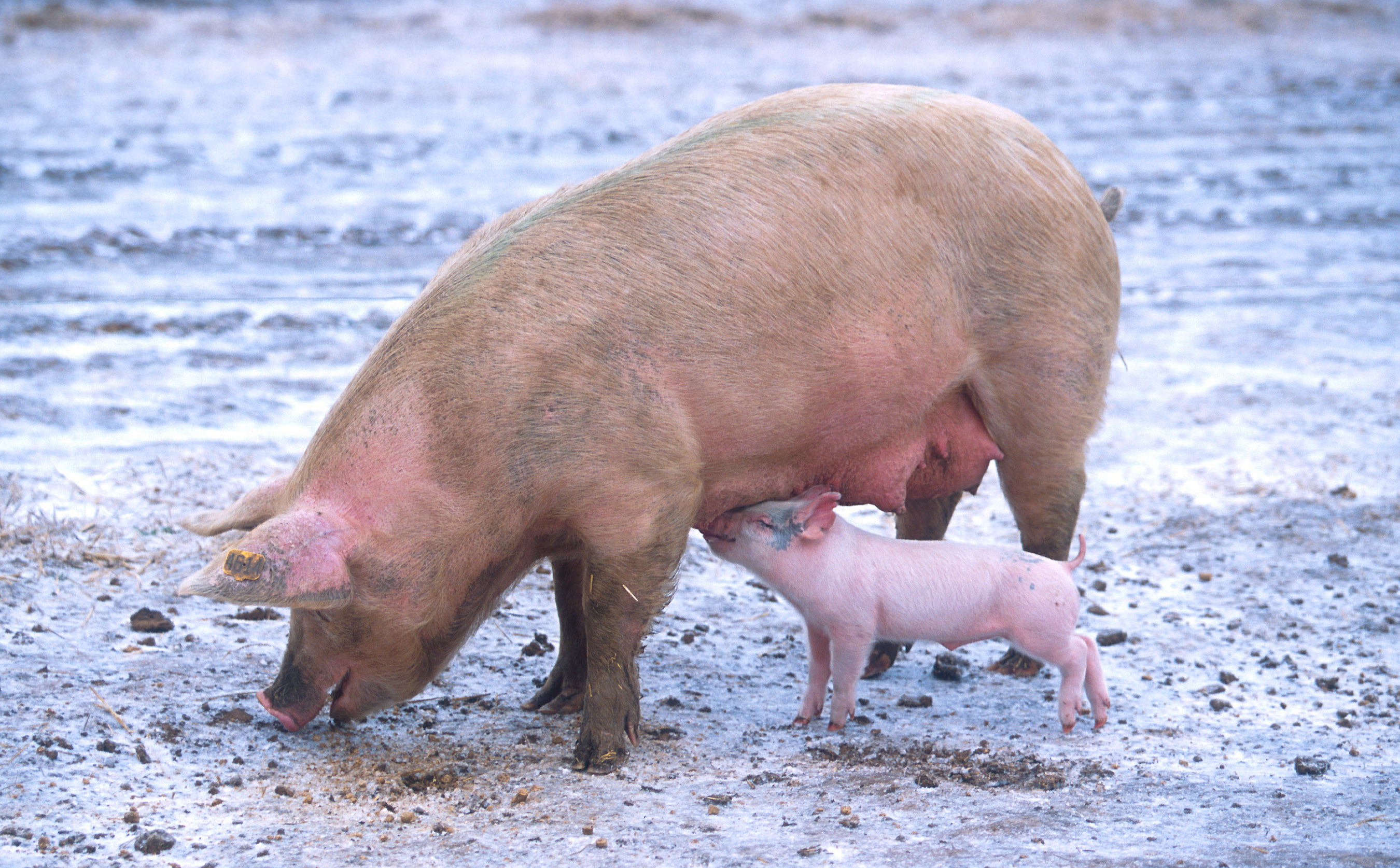
Suckling Piglet with Sow

Since PED is a viral disease, there is no specific treatment for it. PED's most well-documented infection routes are animal transport, transport of infected piglets, visitors on the farm, and manure transport. Many disinfectants can control the PED virus, but oxidative disinfectants such as hydrogen peroxide are generally the most effective.

=== Building immunity ===
The first time the virus is introduced in the herd, adult pigs are often intentionally infected early to allow some immunity to develop. Feedback practice in the United Kingdom and other countries exposes sows to the virus to boost immunity. This process subjects sows to diarrhea three times, at least two days apart, via drinking water; water is then mixed with contaminated material used as a source. Methods of controlled exposure, such as these, boosts immunity. However, inactivated and attenuated vaccines can provide some protection against PED, but the emergence of immunodeficiency or new variant strains may lead to the failure of traditional attenuated vaccines. Maternal antibodies present in colostrum from PED immune sows may provide protection to neonates against oral infection until about 4 to 13 days of age. Still, they may not provide adequate protection against intestinal infection. If PED becomes endemic in finishing units, suspending new additions and in-and-out practices for about three weeks could help decrease the spread of infection.

Reintroduction following an initial outbreak is also an issue. After an acute outbreak, PED may disappear but remain in the farrowing unit because of inadequate hygiene management or persist in pigs in weaning or growing-finishing units. In these environments, the virus can circulate and cause mild post-weaning diarrhea with very low mortality. Even in this endemic status, if newly born pigs are unable to obtain sufficient levels of maternal immunity from their dams due to incomplete sow vaccination or defective lactation due to mastitis, the virus circulating on the farm will infect susceptible piglets, which act as the source of recurrence leading to a high number of pig deaths.
