= ASIC5 =

Protein-coding gene in humans

Identifiers
- Aliases: ASIC5, ACCN5, HINAC, INAC, acid sensing ion channel subunit family member 5
- External IDs: OMIM: 616693; MGI: 1929259; GeneCards: ASIC5

Gene location (Human)
Chr.	Chromosome 4 (human)
Band	4q32.1	Start	155,829,729 bp
Band	4q32.1	End	155,866,277 bp

Gene location (Mouse)
Chr.	Chromosome 3 (mouse)
Band	3|3 E3	Start	81,889,597 bp
Band	3|3 E3	End	81,928,540 bp
RNA expression pattern
Bgee	Human / Mouse (ortholog); Top expressed in: duodenum; skin of thigh; mouth; kidney; metanephros; oral mucosa; salivary gland; minor salivary glands; human kidney; hemolymphoid system / Top expressed in: embryo; liver; left lobe of liver; epithelium of stomach; jejunum; duodenum; choroid plexus of fourth ventricle; yolk sac; perirhinal cortex; superior colliculus; More reference expression data
BioGPS	n/a
Gene ontology
Molecular function	ligand-gated sodium channel activity; proton channel activity; sodium channel activity; acid-sensing ion channel activity
Cellular component	integral component of membrane; plasma membrane; membrane
Biological process	ion transmembrane transport; ion transport; sodium ion transmembrane transport; sodium ion transport; proton transmembrane transport
Sources:Amigo / QuickGO
Orthologs
Databases	NCBI: entry; OMA: entry
Species	Human	Mouse
Entrez	51802	58170
Ensembl	ENSG00000256394; ENSG00000262505	ENSMUSG00000028008
UniProt	Q9NY37	Q9R0Y1
RefSeq (mRNA)	NM_017419	NM_021370
RefSeq (protein)	NP_059115	NP_067345
Location (UCSC)	Chr 4: 155.83 – 155.87 Mb	Chr 3: 81.89 – 81.93 Mb
PubMed search
- Wikidata
View/Edit Human	View/Edit Mouse

ASIC5 gene is one of the five paralogous genes that encode proteins that form trimeric Acid-sensing ion channels (ASICs) in mammals. Aliases previously used for this gene include ACCN5 and BASIC. The protein encoded by this gene does not appear to be acid responsive. The cDNA coding for this protein was first characterized in 2000.

== Gene ==
The ASIC genes have splicing variants that encode different proteins that are called isoforms.

== Tissue distribution ==
These genes are mainly expressed in the central and peripheral nervous system.

== Structure ==
ASICs can form both homotrimeric (meaning composed of three identical subunits) and heterotrimeric channels.

The pore of the channel through which ions selectively flow from the extracellular side into the cytoplasm is formed by the three TM2 regions of the trimer.

== Function ==
This gene encodes a member of the ASIC/ENaC superfamily of proteins. The members of this family are amiloride-sensitive sodium channels that contain intracellular N and C termini, 2 hydrophobic transmembrane (TM) regions, and a large extracellular loop, which has many cysteine residues with conserved spacing. The TM regions are generally symbolized as TM1 (clone to N-terminus) and TM2 (close to C-terminus).
