= ASIC4 =

Protein found in humans

Identifiers
- Aliases: ASIC4, ACCN4, BNAC4, acid sensing ion channel subunit family member 4
- External IDs: OMIM: 606715; MGI: 2652846; GeneCards: ASIC4

Gene location (Human)
| Chr. | Chromosome 2 (human) |
| Band | 2q35 | Start | 219,514,170 bp |
| Band | 2q35 | End | 219,538,772 bp |

Gene location (Mouse)
| Chr. | Chromosome 1 (mouse) |
| Band | 1|1 C4 | Start | 75,427,080 bp |
| Band | 1|1 C4 | End | 75,450,987 bp |
RNA expression pattern
| Bgee | Human / Mouse (ortholog); Top expressed in: pituitary gland; anterior pituitary; right hemisphere of cerebellum; amygdala; cingulate gyrus; anterior cingulate cortex; lateral nuclear group of thalamus; right frontal lobe; hypothalamus; substantia nigra / Top expressed in: neural layer of retina; superior frontal gyrus; dentate gyrus of hippocampal formation granule cell; primary visual cortex; olfactory tubercle; embryo; superior colliculus; nucleus accumbens; central gray substance of midbrain; lumbar subsegment of spinal cord; More reference expression data |
| BioGPS | n/a |
Gene ontology
| Molecular function | ion channel activity; sodium ion transmembrane transporter activity; sodium channel activity |
| Cellular component | integral component of membrane; integral component of plasma membrane; membrane |
| Biological process | ion transport; sodium ion transport; ion transmembrane transport; sodium ion transmembrane transport; behavioral fear response |
Sources:Amigo / QuickGO
Orthologs
| Databases | NCBI: entry; OMA: entry |
| Species | Human | Mouse |
| Entrez | 55515 | 241118 |
| Ensembl | ENSG00000072182 | ENSMUSG00000033007 |
| UniProt | Q96FT7 | Q7TNS7 |
| RefSeq (mRNA) | NM_018674; NM_182847 | NM_183022 |
| RefSeq (protein) | NP_061144; NP_878267 | NP_898843 |
| Location (UCSC) | Chr 2: 219.51 – 219.54 Mb | Chr 1: 75.43 – 75.45 Mb |
| PubMed search |
- Wikidata
| View/Edit Human | View/Edit Mouse |

Acid-sensing ion channel 4 (ASIC4) also known as amiloride-sensitive cation channel 4 (ACCN4) is a protein that in humans is encoded by the ASIC4 gene. The ASIC4 gene is one of the five paralogous genes that encode proteins that form trimeric acid-sensing ion channels (ASICs) in mammals. The cDNA of this gene was first cloned in 2000. The ASIC genes have splicing variants that encode different proteins that are called isoforms.

These genes are mainly expressed in the central and peripheral nervous system.

ASICs can form both homotrimeric (meaning composed of three identical subunits) and heterotrimeric channels.

== Structure and function ==
This gene encodes a member of the ASIC/ENaC superfamily of proteins. The members of this family are amiloride-sensitive sodium channels that contain intracellular N and C termini, 2 hydrophobic transmembrane (TM) regions, and a large extracellular loop, which has many cysteine residues with conserved spacing. The TM regions are generally symbolized as TM1 (close to N-terminus) and TM2 (close to C-terminus).

The pore of the channel through which ions selectively flow from the extracellular side into the cytoplasm is formed by the three TM2 regions of the trimer.
