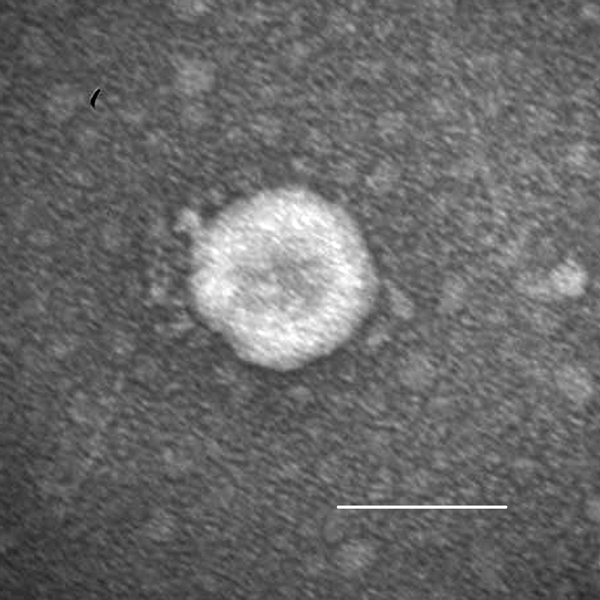
- Electron micrograph of coronavirus HKU15. Scale bar indicates 100 nm.

Virus classification
- (unranked): Virus
- Realm: Riboviria
- Kingdom: Orthornavirae
- Phylum: Pisuviricota
- Class: Pisoniviricetes
- Order: Nidovirales
- Family: Coronaviridae
- Subfamily: Orthocoronavirinae
- Genus: Deltacoronavirus

= Deltacoronavirus =

Genus of viruses

Deltacoronavirus (Delta-CoV) is one of the four genera (Alpha-, Beta-, Gamma-, and Delta-) of coronaviruses. It is in the subfamily Orthocoronavirinae of the family Coronaviridae. They are enveloped, positive-sense, single-stranded RNA viruses. Deltacoronaviruses infect mostly birds and some mammals.

While the alpha and beta genera are derived from the bat viral gene pool, the gamma and delta genera are derived from the avian and pig viral gene pools.

Recombination appears to be common among deltacoronaviruses. Recombination occurs frequently in the viral genome region that encodes the host receptor binding protein. Recombination between different viral lineages contributes to the emergence of new viruses capable of interspecies transmission and adaptation to new animal hosts.

== Taxonomy ==
The genus contains the following subgenera and species:

- Subgenus: Andecovirus
  - Deltacoronavirus marecae, Wigeon coronavirus HKU20
- Subgenus: Buldecovirus
  - Deltacoronavirus gallinulae, Common moorhen coronavirus HKU21
  - Deltacoronavirus lonchurae, Munia coronavirus HKU13
  - Deltacoronavirus pycnonoti, Bulbul coronavirus HKU11
  - Deltacoronavirus suis, Porcine coronavirus HKU15
  - Deltacoronavirus zosteropis, White-eye coronavirus HKU16
- Subgenus: Herdecovirus
  - Deltacoronavirus nycticoracis, Night heron coronavirus HKU19

== See also ==
- RNA virus
- Sense (molecular biology)
- Veterinary virology
