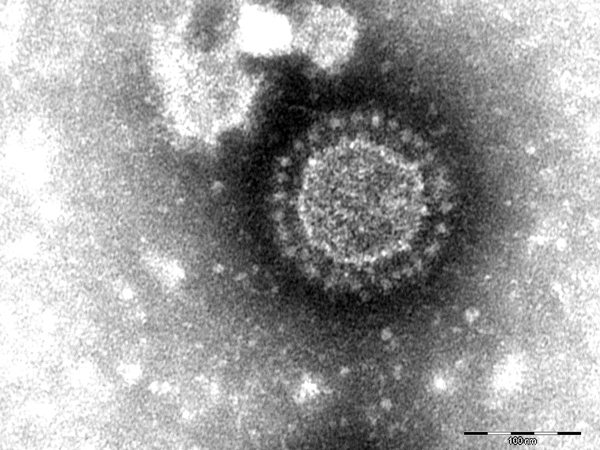
- Porcine epidemic diarrhea virus particles seen by electron microscopy

Virus classification
- (unranked): Virus
- Realm: Riboviria
- Kingdom: Orthornavirae
- Phylum: Pisuviricota
- Class: Pisoniviricetes
- Order: Nidovirales
- Family: Coronaviridae
- Genus: Alphacoronavirus
- Subgenus: Pedacovirus
- Species: Alphacoronavirus porci

= Porcine epidemic diarrhea virus =

Species of virus

Porcine epidemic diarrhea virus (PED virus or PEDV) is a coronavirus that infects the cells lining the small intestine of a pig, causing porcine epidemic diarrhoea, a condition of severe diarrhea and dehydration. Older hogs mostly get sick and lose weight after being infected, whereas newborn piglets usually die within five days of contracting the virus. PEDV cannot be transmitted to humans, nor contaminate the human food supply.

It was first discovered in Europe, but has become increasingly problematic in Asian countries, such as Korea, China, Japan, the Philippines, and Thailand. It has also spread to North America: it was discovered in the United States on May 5, 2013 in Indiana, and in Canada in the winter of 2014. In January 2014, a new variant strain of PEDV with three deletions, one insertion, and several mutations in S (spike) 1 region was identified in Ohio by the Animal Disease Diagnostic Lab of Ohio Department of Agriculture.

PEDV has a substantial economic burden given that it is highly infectious, resulting in significant morbidity and mortality in piglets. Morbidity and mortality rates were lower for vaccinated herds than for nonvaccinated herds, which suggests the emergence of a new PEDV field strain(s) for which the current vaccine, based on the CV777 strain, was partially protective. Consumers are likely to feel the effects of the viral disease in the form of higher prices for pork products.

== Evolution ==
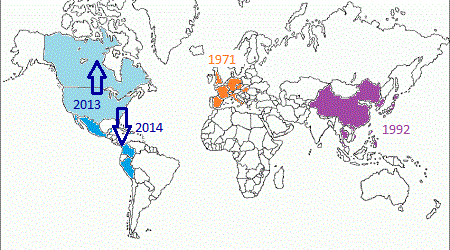
Geographic spread of PEDV by year.

A Bayesian study of 138 genomes showed that the virus has six subtypes. Groups 1 and 2 originated in North America and groups 3–5 originated in Asia. The evolution rate of the genome was estimated to be 3.38 × 10^{−4} substitutions/site/year similar to other RNA viruses. The most recent common ancestor of the extant strains evolved ~1943.

== Clinical Signs ==
PED is an acute disease with an incubation period of 1–4 days. The virus causes diarrhea and vomiting resulting in severe dehydration. In neonates the mortality can be up to 100% in virulent strains. Older pigs generally recover in 7–10 days. Piglets when sick often lie in groups or lie on the mother's belly because they are cold.

== Transmission ==
PED is transmitted by fecal-oral transmission and the infectious dose is low. Pre-weaned piglets shed large amounts of virus in their feces resulting in rapid spread and high mortality rates. Older animals do not shed as much virus in their feces as piglets. It can also be spread via contaminated fomites. A study showed that aerosolized virus particles can spread up to 10 miles from the source of infection.

== Necropsy findings ==
Post-mortem findings in suckling animals include empty stomach contents with little milk curd. The intestines are thin walled and distended, filled with a watery content. Diagnosis of PED is confirmed using PCR from feces or intestines of affected animals, or by immunohistochemistry on formalin-fixed tissue.

== See also ==
- Feedback (pork industry)
