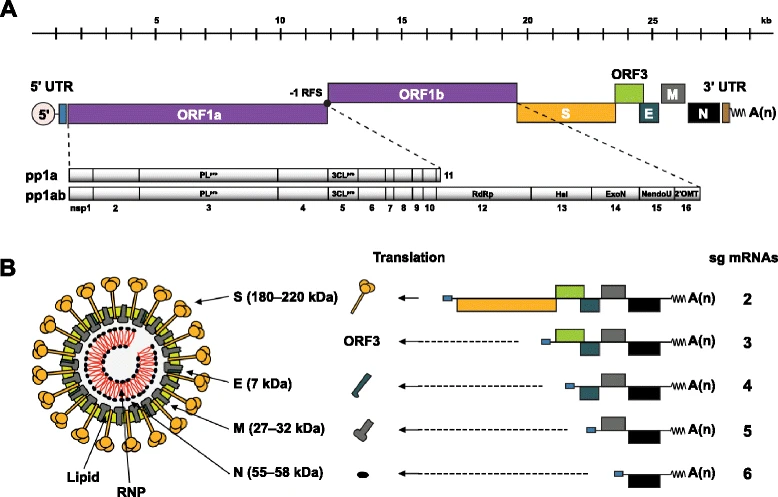
- Porcine epidemic diarrhea virus genome and virion structure

Virus classification
- (unranked): Virus
- Realm: Riboviria
- Kingdom: Orthornavirae
- Phylum: Pisuviricota
- Class: Pisoniviricetes
- Order: Nidovirales
- Family: Coronaviridae
- Subfamily: Orthocoronavirinae
- Genus: Alphacoronavirus

Subgenera and species
- See text

= Alphacoronavirus =

Genus of viruses

Alphacoronaviruses (Alpha-CoV) are members of the first of the four genera (Alpha-, Beta-, Gamma-, and Delta-) of coronaviruses. They are positive-sense, single-stranded RNA viruses that infect mammals, including humans. They have spherical virions with club-shaped surface projections formed by trimers of the spike protein, and a viral envelope.

Alphacoronaviruses are in the subfamily Orthocoronavirinae of the family Coronaviridae. Both the Alpha- and Betacoronavirus lineages descend from the bat viral gene pool. Alphacoronaviruses were previously known as "phylogroup 1 coronaviruses".

The Alphacoronavirus genus is very diverse, particularly in bats. Most bat originating strains haven't been successfully isolated and cultured in laboratory. Alphacoronaviruses infecting other mammal species have been much better studied, see List of Coronavirus live isolates.

== Etymology ==
The name alphacoronavirus is derived from Ancient Greek ἄλφα (álpha, "the first letter of the Greek alphabet"), and κορώνη (korṓnē, "garland, wreath"), meaning crown, which describes the appearance of the surface projections seen under electron microscopy that resemble a solar corona.

== Structure ==
The virion is enveloped and spherical measuring 120–160 nm in diameter and a core shell of about 65 nm. Glycoproteins and trimers form large surface projections which create the appearance of solar corona. This genus, like other coronaviruses, has a spike protein with a type I fusion machine (S2) and a receptor-binding domain (S1). It assembles into a trimer. Unlike beta- and gammacoronaviruses, this protein is not cleaved into two halves.

== Genome ==
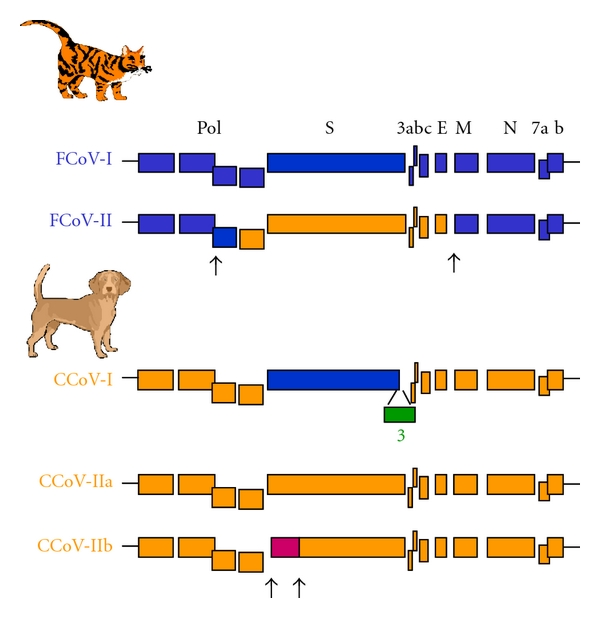
Genetic relationships between the different feline coronaviruses (FCov) and canine coronaviruses (CCoV) genotypes. Recombination at arrows.

The genome is positive-sense, single-stranded RNA with a length of 27 to 29 kilobases and a 3'-polyA tail. Two large, overlapping ORFs at the 5'-end of the genome encode the major non-structural proteins expressed as a fusion protein by ribosomal frameshift. These include regions with protease, helicase and RNA polymerase motifs. There are seven other genes downstream which encode structural proteins. These are expressed from a 3'-coterminal nested set of subgenomic mRNAs.

== Recombination ==
Feline coronavirus (FCoV) and canine coronavirus (CCoV) are known to exist in two serotypes. Serotype II targets Aminopeptidase N, while the receptor for Serotype I is unknown. The difference is due to a different spike protein. There is a common ancestor for FCoV and CCoV. This ancestor gradually evolved into FCoV I and CCoV I. An S protein from an unknown virus was recombined into the ancestor and gave rise to CCoV II. CCoV II once again recombined with FCoV to create FCoV II. CCoV II gradually evolved into TGEV. A spike deletion in TGEV creates PRCV. All these viruses are sorted into the subgenus Tegacovirus.

== Classification ==
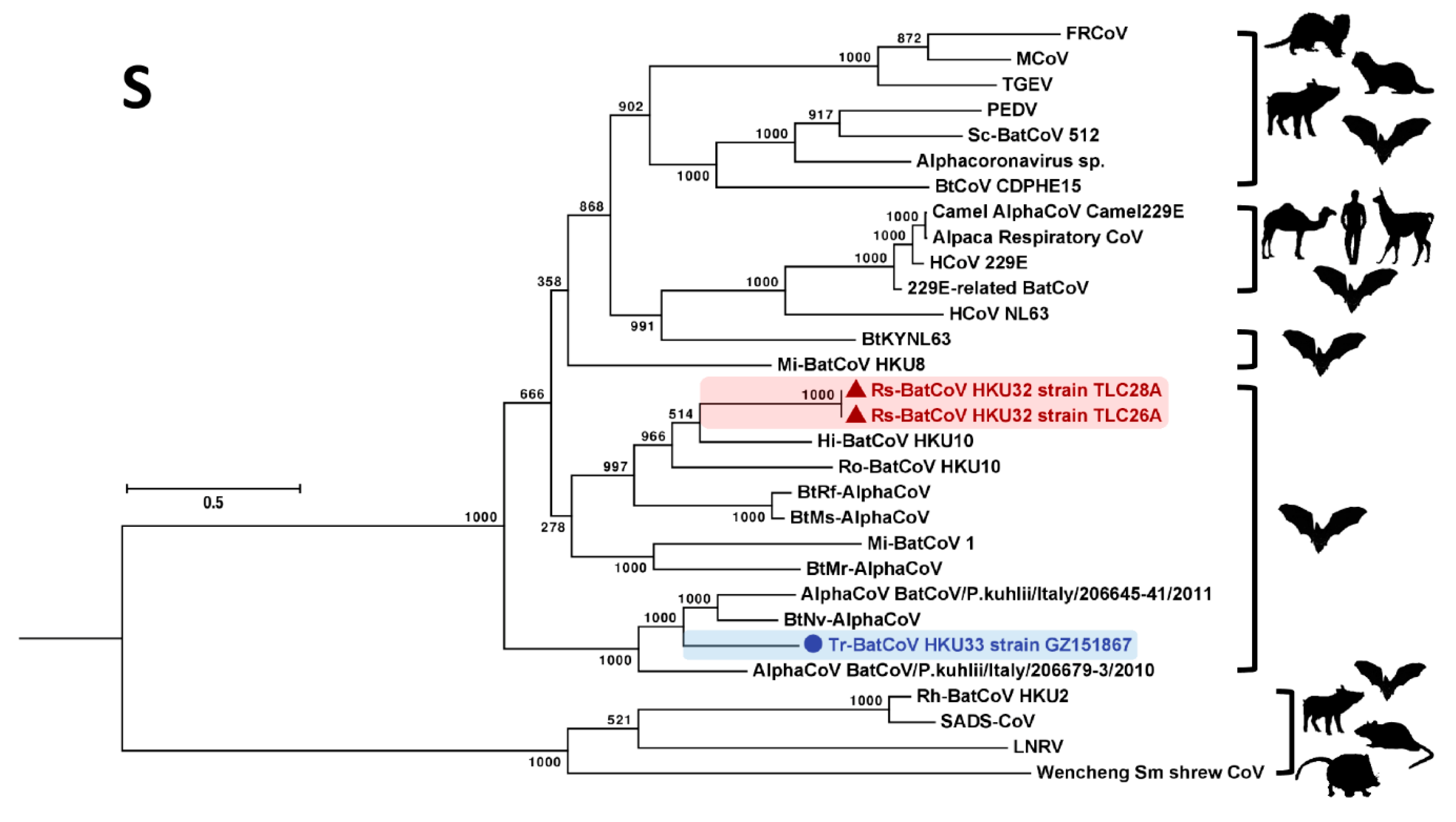
Phylogentic tree of the genus Alphacoronavirus with host animals indicated on the right hand side.

The genus contains the following subgenera and species:

- Amalacovirus
  - Alphacoronavirus almalfi, Bat alphacoronavirus AMA_L_F
- Colacovirus
  - Alphacoronavirus myotis, Bat coronavirus CDPHE15
- Decacovirus
  - Alphacoronavirus australiense, Alphacoronavirus WA3607
  - Alphacoronavirus ferrumequini, Rhinolophus ferrumequinum alphacoronavirus HuB-2013
  - Alphacoronavirus hipposideri, Hipposideros pomona bat coronavirus CHB25
  - Alphacoronavirus rousetti, Rousettus bat coronavirus HKU10
- Duvinacovirus
  - Alphacoronavirus chicagoense, Human coronavirus 229E
- Luchacovirus
  - Alphacoronavirus ratti, Lucheng Rn rat coronavirus
- Minacovirus
  - Alphacoronavirus neovisontis, Mink coronavirus
    - Ferret coronavirus
- Minunacovirus
  - Alphacoronavirus miniopteri, Miniopterus bat coronavirus HKU8
  - Alphacoronavirus pusilli, Miniopterus bat coronavirus 1
- Myotacovirus
  - Alphacoronavirus ricketti, Myotis ricketti alphacoronavirus Sax-2011
- Nyctacovirus
  - Alphacoronavirus chalinolobi, Alphacoronavirus WA2028
  - Alphacoronavirus nyctali, Nyctalus velutinus alphacoronavirus SC-2013
  - Alphacoronavirus pipistrelli, Alphacoronavirus bat coronavirus
  - Alphacoronavirus tylonycteridis, Tylonycteris bat coronavirus HKU33
- Pedacovirus
  - Alphacoronavirus finnoniense
  - Alphacoronavirus gouldii, Alphacoronavirus WA1087
  - Alphacoronavirus porci, Porcine epidemic diarrhea virus
  - Alphacoronavirus scotophili, Scotophilus bat coronavirus 512
- Rhinacovirus
  - Alphacoronavirus rhinolophi, Rhinolophus bat coronavirus HKU2
- Setracovirus
  - Alphacoronavirus amsterdamense, Human coronavirus NL63
  - Alphacoronavirus triaenopis, NL63-related bat coronavirus
- Soracovirus
  - Alphacoronavirus soricis, Common shrew coronavirus Tibet-2014
- Sunacovirus
  - Alphacoronavirus sunci, Suncus murinus coronavirus Xingguo-74
- Tegacovirus
  - Alphacoronavirus suis
    - Canine coronavirus
    - Feline coronavirus
    - Human CCoV-HuPn-2018
    - Porcine transmissible gastroenteritis coronavirus

== See also ==
- Betacoronavirus
- Coronavirus
- RNA virus
