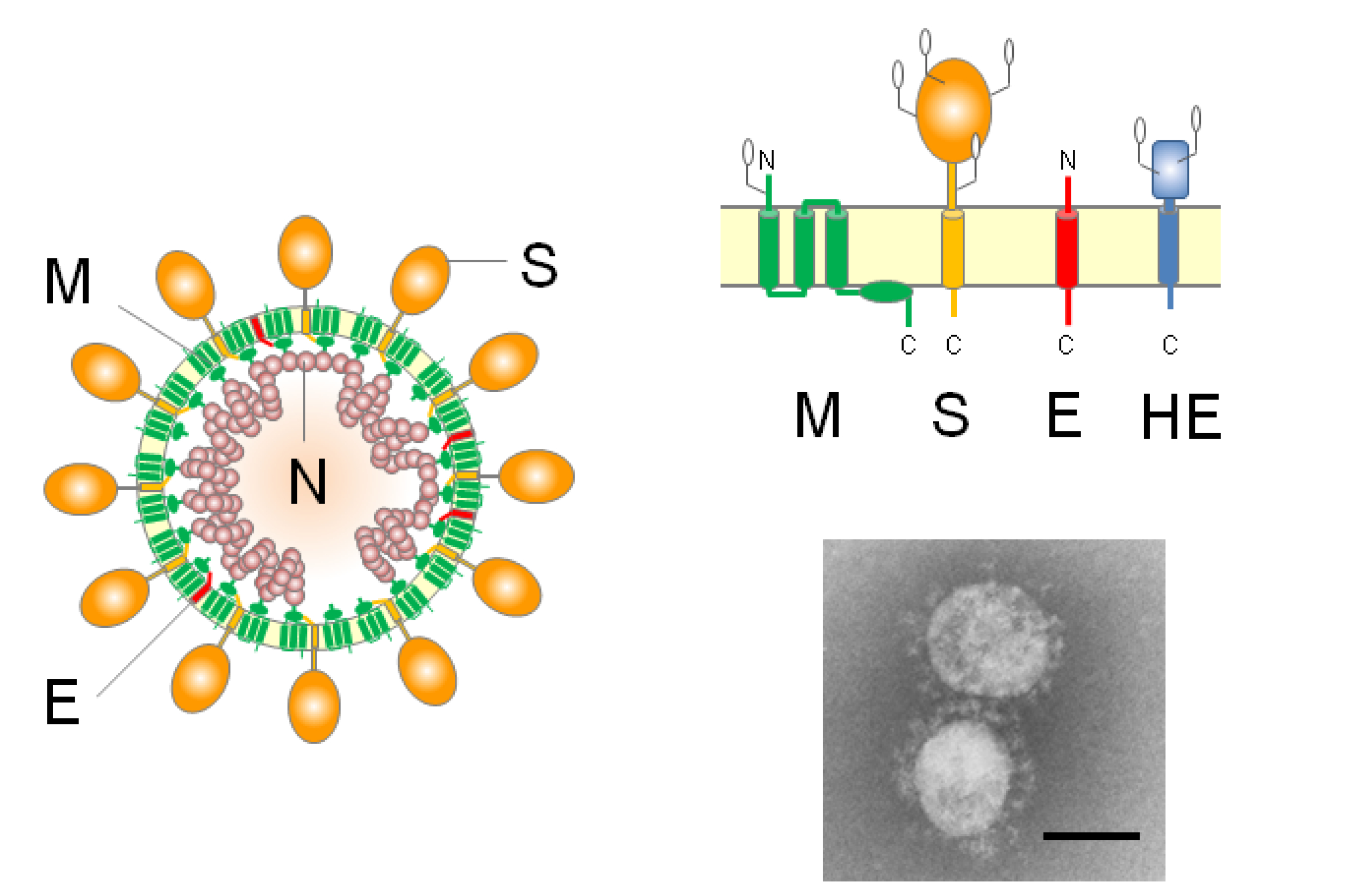

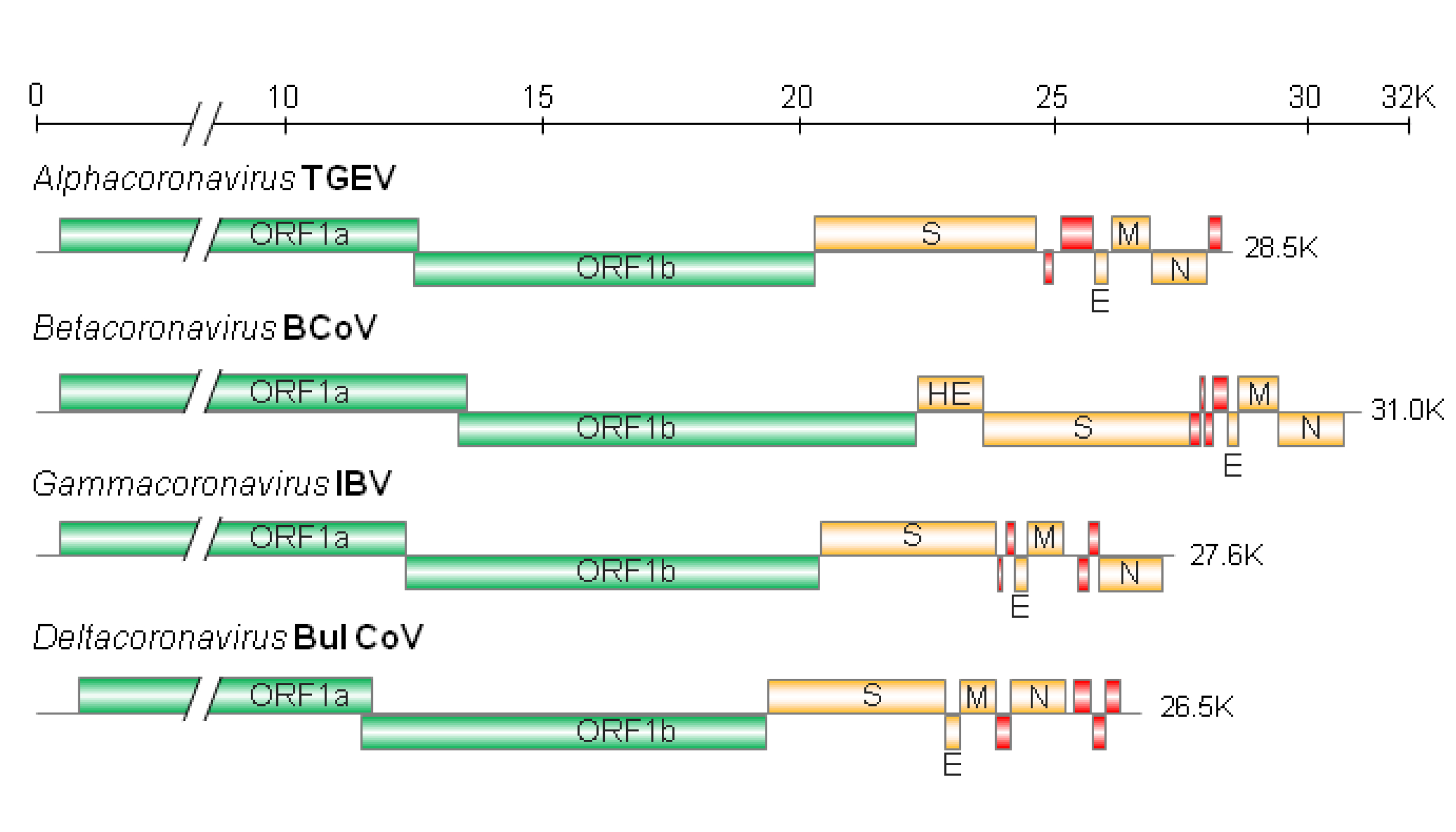
- Diagram, electron micrograph, and genome of coronavirus types.

Virus classification
- (unranked): Virus
- Realm: Riboviria
- Kingdom: Orthornavirae
- Phylum: Pisuviricota
- Class: Pisoniviricetes
- Order: Nidovirales
- Suborder: Cornidovirineae
- Family: Coronaviridae

Subfamilies and genera
- Letovirinae; Alphaletovirus; Orthocoronavirinae; Alphacoronavirus; Betacoronavirus; Gammacoronavirus; Deltacoronavirus; Pitovirinae; Alphapironavirus

= Coronaviridae =

Family of viruses in the order Nidovirales

Coronaviridae is a family of enveloped, positive-strand RNA viruses which infect fish, amphibians, birds, and mammals. The group includes the subfamilies Letovirinae, Orthocoronavirinae, and Pitovirinae. The members of the subfamily Orthocoronavirinae are known as coronaviruses.

The viral genome is 26–32 kilobases in length. The particles are typically decorated with large (~20 nm), club- or petal-shaped surface projections (the "peplomers" or "spikes"), which in electron micrographs of spherical particles create an image reminiscent of the solar corona.

== Virology ==
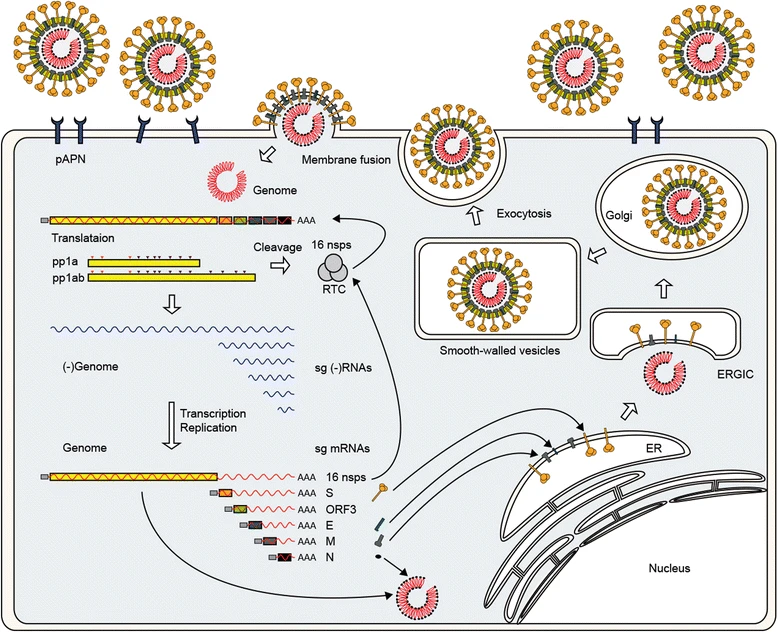
Replication cycle of a coronavirus

The 5' and 3' ends of the genome have a cap and poly(A) tract, respectively. The viral envelope, obtained by budding through membranes of the endoplasmic reticulum (ER) or Golgi apparatus, invariably contains two virus-specified glycoprotein species, known as the spike (S) and membrane (M) proteins. The spike protein makes up the large surface projections (sometimes known as peplomers), while the membrane protein is a triple-spanning transmembrane protein. Toroviruses and a select subset of coronaviruses (in particular the members of subgroup A in the genus Betacoronavirus) possess, in addition to the peplomers composed of S, a second type of surface projections composed of the hemagglutinin-esterase protein. Another important structural protein is the phosphoprotein nucleocapsid protein (N), which is responsible for the helical symmetry of the nucleocapsid that encloses the genomic RNA. The fourth and smallest viral structural protein is known as the envelope protein (E), thought to be involved in viral budding.

Genetic recombination can occur when at least two viral genomes are present in the same infected host cell. RNA recombination appears to be a major driving force in coronavirus evolution. Recombination can determine genetic variability within a CoV species, the capability of a CoV species to jump from one host to another and, infrequently, the emergence of a novel CoV. The exact mechanism of recombination in CoVs is not known, but likely involves template switching during genome replication.

== Taxonomy ==
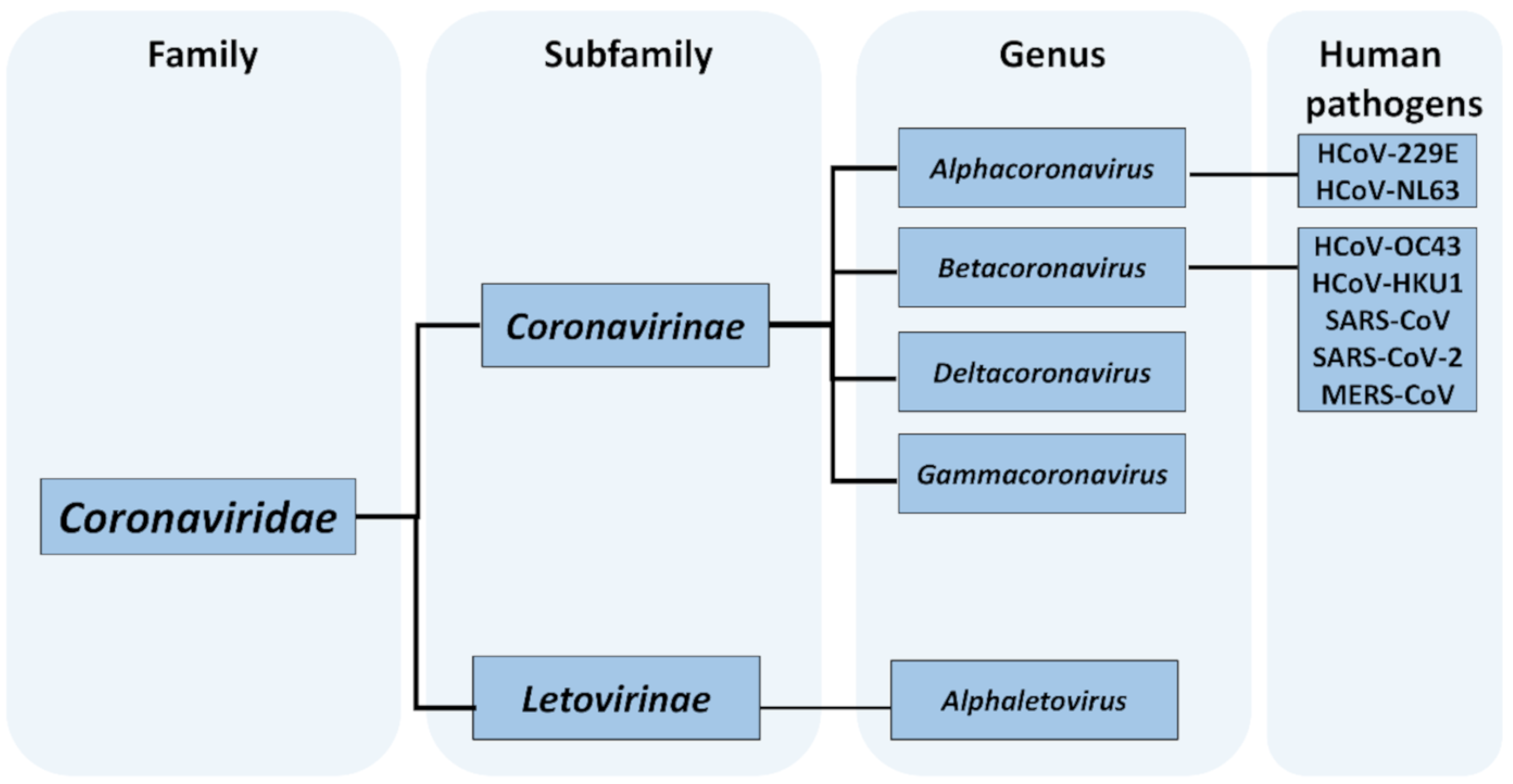
Taxonomy of family Coronaviridae with species pathogenic to humans

The family Coronaviridae is organized in 3 subfamilies, 6 genera, 28 sub-genera, and 54 species. Additional species are pending or tentative. The subfamilies and genera of the family are listed hereafter (-virinae denotes subfamily and -virus denotes genus):

- Letovirinae
  - Alphaletovirus
- Orthocoronavirinae
  - Alphacoronavirus
  - Betacoronavirus
  - Gammacoronavirus
  - Deltacoronavirus
- Pitovirinae
  - Alphapironavirus

=== Coronavirus ===
Coronavirus is the common name for Orthocoronavirinae, previously called Coronavirinae. Coronaviruses cause diseases in mammals and birds. In humans, the viruses cause respiratory infections. Four human coronaviruses cause typically minor symptoms of a common cold, while three are known to cause more serious illness and can be lethal: SARS-CoV-1, which causes SARS; MERS-CoV, which causes MERS; and SARS-CoV-2, which causes COVID-19. Symptoms vary in other species: in chickens, they cause an upper respiratory disease, while in cows and pigs coronaviruses cause diarrhea. Other than for SARS-CoV-2, there are no vaccines or antiviral drugs to prevent or treat human coronavirus infections. They are enveloped viruses with a positive-sense single-stranded RNA genome and a nucleocapsid of helical symmetry. The genome size of coronaviruses ranges from approximately 26 to 32 kilobases, among the largest for an RNA virus (second only to a 41-kb nidovirus recently discovered in planaria).

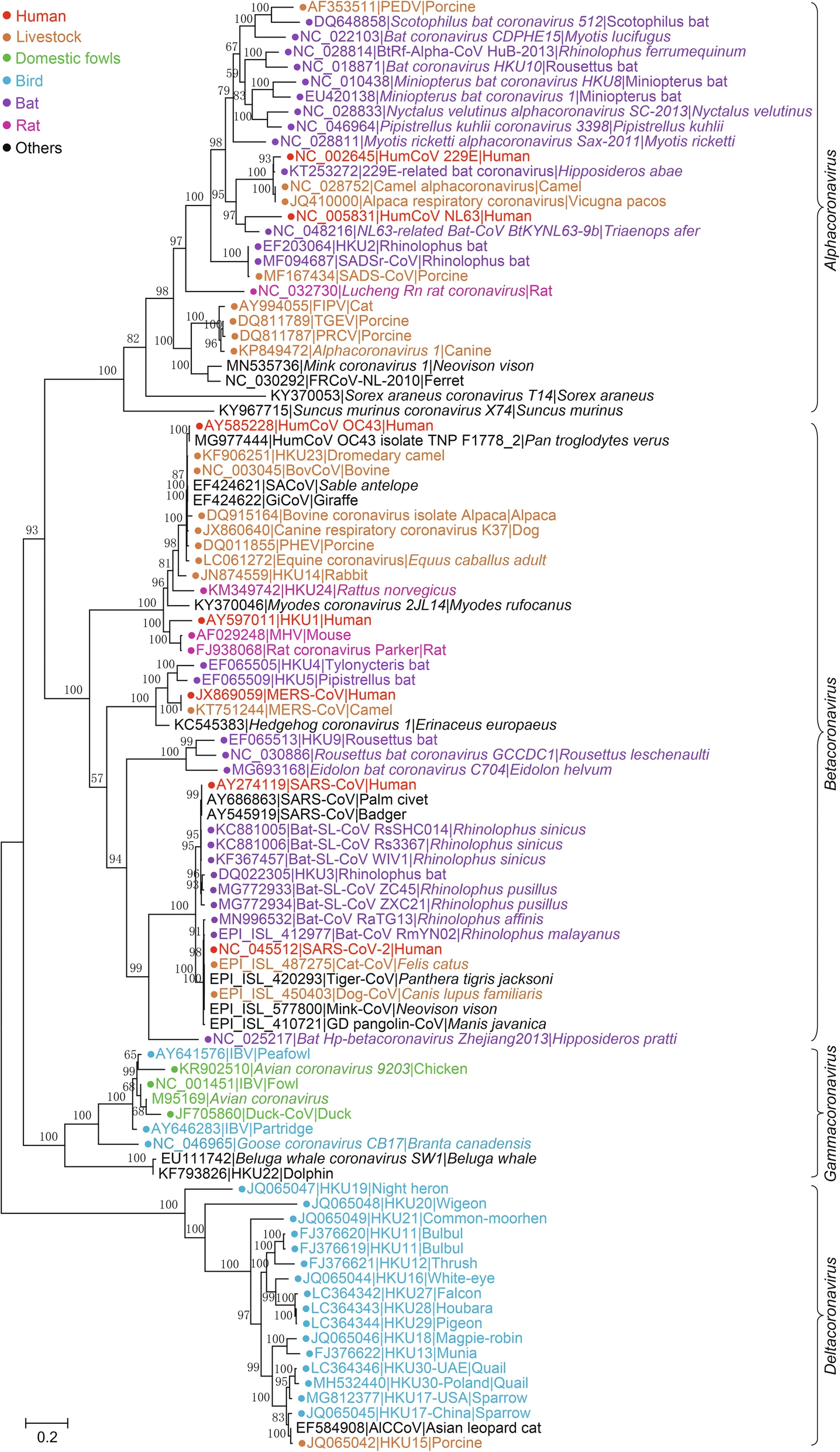
Phylogenetic tree of Coronaviridae with host species indicated by color
