= Canine coronavirus HuPn-2018 =

Virus classification
- (unranked): Virus
- Realm: Riboviria
- Kingdom: Orthornavirae
- Phylum: Pisuviricota
- Class: Pisoniviricetes
- Order: Nidovirales
- Family: Coronaviridae
- Genus: Alphacoronavirus
- Subgenus: Tegacovirus
- Species: Alphacoronavirus suis
- Virus: Canine coronavirus HuPn-2018

Species of canine coronavirus

Canine coronavirus HuPn-2018, or CCoV-HuPn-2018, is a virus first discovered in a surveillance study in Sarawak, Malaysia, in hospitalized human pneumonia patients. It may be the eighth coronavirus known to cause disease in humans, but no human-to-human transmission has been seen. This is a canine-feline recombinant alphacoronavirus (genotype II) related to the CCoV-II strain of Alphacoronavirus suis with part of the FCoV in S2 domain and a specific 12 amino acids deletion in the N protein.

CCoV-HuPn-2018 was later seen in a University of Florida researcher who had just returned from Haiti.
