= Igacovirus =

Virus classification
- (unranked): Virus
- Realm: Riboviria
- Kingdom: Orthornavirae
- Phylum: Pisuviricota
- Class: Pisoniviricetes
- Order: Nidovirales
- Family: Coronaviridae
- Genus: Gammacoronavirus
- Subgenus: Igacovirus

Subgenus of viruses

Igacovirus is a subgenus of viruses in the genus Gammacoronavirus.

== Species ==
The subgenus contains the following species, listed by scientific name and followed by the exemplar virus of the species:

- Gammacoronavirus anatis, Duck coronavirus 2714
- Gammacoronavirus galli, Infectious bronchitis virus
- Gammacoronavirus pulli, Avian coronavirus 9203
