= ATCvet code QI07 =

Veterinary medical products classification subgroup

ATCvet code QI07 Immunologicals for Canidae is a therapeutic subgroup of the Anatomical Therapeutic Chemical Classification System for veterinary medicinal products, a system of alphanumeric codes developed by the World Health Organization (WHO) for the classification of drugs and other medical products for veterinary use. Subgroup QI07 is part of the anatomical group QI Immunologicals.

National versions of the ATC classification may include additional codes not present in this list, which follows the WHO version.

== QI07A Dog ==
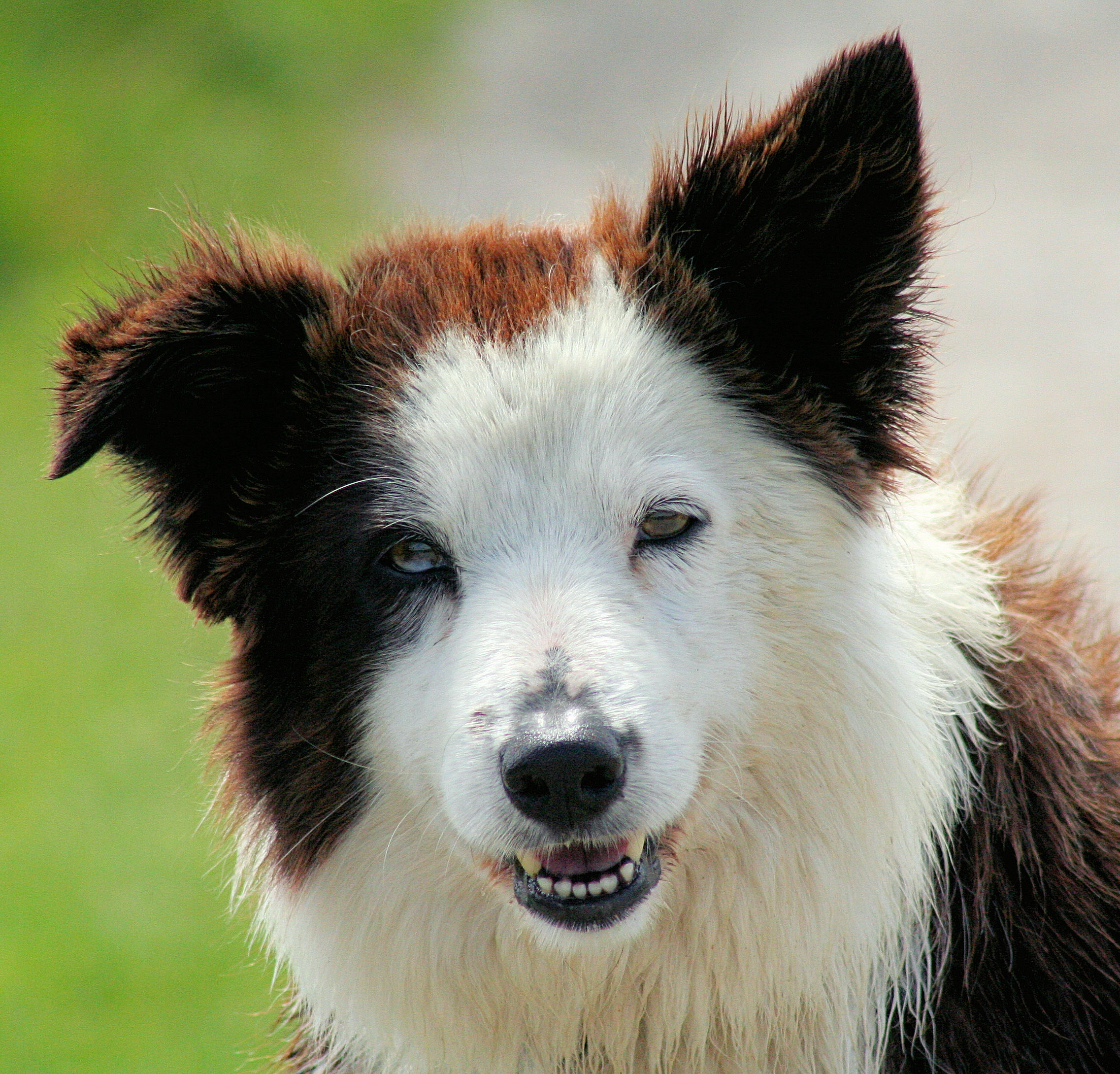

=== QI07AA Inactivated viral vaccines ===
QI07AA01 Canine parvovirus
QI07AA02 Rabies virus
QI07AA03 Canine parainfluenza virus + canine reovirus + canine influenza virus
QI07AA04 Canine parainfluenza virus
QI07AA05 Canine adenovirus
QI07AA06 Canine herpesvirus
QI07AA07 Canine influenza virus

=== QI07AB Inactivated bacterial vaccines (including mycoplasma, toxoid and chlamydia) ===
QI07AB01 Leptospira
QI07AB02 Staphylococcus
QI07AB03 Bordetella
QI07AB04 Borrelia

=== QI07AC Inactivated bacterial vaccines and antisera ===
Empty group

=== QI07AD Live viral vaccines ===
QI07AD01 Canine parvovirus
QI07AD02 Canine distemper virus + canine adenovirus + canine parvovirus
QI07AD03 Canine distemper virus + canine parvovirus
QI07AD04 Canine distemper virus + canine adenovirus + canine parvovirus + canine parainfluenza virus
QI07AD05 Canine distemper virus
QI07AD06 Canine distemper virus + canine adenovirus
QI07AD07 Canine distemper virus + canine parainfluenza virus
QI07AD08 Canine parainfluenza virus
QI07AD09 Canine parvovirus + canine parainfluenza virus
QI07AD10 Canine distemper virus + canine adenovirus + canine parainfluenza virus
QI07AD11 Canine coronavirus
QI07AD12 Canine coronavirus + canine parvovirus
QI07AD13 Canine parapox virus
QI07AD14 Canine distemper virus based on measles virus

=== QI07AE Live bacterial vaccines ===
QI07AE01 Bordetella

=== QI07AF Live bacterial and viral vaccines ===
QI07AF01 Bordetella + canine parainfluenza virus
QI07AF02 Bordetella + canine adenovirus + canine parainfluenza virus

=== QI07AG Live and inactivated bacterial vaccines ===
Empty group

=== QI07AH Live and inactivated viral vaccines ===
QI07AH01 Live canine distemper virus + inactivated canine adenovirus + inactivated canine parvovirus
QI07AH02 Live canine parainfluenza virus + inactivated canine parvovirus
QI07AH03 Live canine distemper virus + live canine parainfluenza virus + inactivated canine adenovirus + inactivated canine parvovirus
QI07AH04 Live canine distemper virus + live canine parvovirus + inactivated canine coronavirus
QI07AH05 Live canine distemper virus + live canine adenovirus + live canine parvovirus + live canine parainfluenza virus + inactivated feline coronavirus
QI07AH06 Live canine parainfluenza virus + inactivated feline coronavirus

=== QI07AI Live viral and inactivated bacterial vaccines ===
QI07AI01 Live canine distemper virus + live canine adenovirus + inactivated leptospira
QI07AI02 Live canine distemper virus + live canine adenovirus + live canine parainfluenza virus + live canine parvovirus + inactivated leptospira
QI07AI03 Live canine distemper virus + live canine adenovirus + live canine parvovirus + inactivated leptospira
QI07AI04 Live canine distemper virus + inactivated leptospira
QI07AI05 Live canine parvovirus + inactivated leptospira
QI07AI06 Live canine distemper virus + live canine parvovirus + inactivated leptospira
QI07AI07 Live canine parvovirus + live canine parainfluenza virus + inactivated leptospira
QI07AI08 Live canine parainfluenza virus + inactivated leptospira

=== QI07AJ Live and inactivated viral and bacterial vaccines ===
QI07AJ01 Live canine distemper virus + inactivated canine adenovirus + inactivated rabies + inactivated leptospira
QI07AJ02 Live canine distemper virus + inactivated canine adenovirus + inactivated leptospira
QI07AJ03 Live canine distemper virus + inactivated canine adenovirus + inactivated canine parvovirus + inactivated leptospira
QI07AJ04 Live canine distemper virus + inactivated canine adenovirus + inactivated canine parvovirus + inactivated rabies + inactivated leptospira
QI07AJ05 Live canine distemper virus + live canine adenovirus + live canine parvovirus + inactivated rabies + inactivated leptospira
QI07AJ06 Live canine distemper virus + live canine adenovirus + live parainfluenza virus + live canine parvovirus + inactivated rabies + inactivated leptospira
QI07AJ07 Live canine distemper virus + live canine adenovirus + inactivated rabies + inactivated leptospira
QI07AJ08 Live canine distemper virus + live canine adenovirus + inactivated canine parvovirus + inactivated leptospira
QI07AJ09 Live canine distemper virus + live canine adenovirus + live canine parvovirus + inactivated leptospira
QI07AJ10 Live canine distemper virus + live canine adenovirus + live parainfluenza virus + live canine parvovirus + inactivated canine coronavirus + inactivated leptospira
QI07AJ11 Live canine parvovirus + live canine parainfluenza virus + inactivated leptospira + inactivated canine coronavirus
QI07AJ12 Live canine parainfluenza virus + inactivated leptospira + inactivated canine coronavirus

=== QI07AK Inactivated viral and live bacterial vaccines ===
Empty group

=== QI07AL Inactivated viral and inactivated bacterial vaccines ===
QI07AL01 Rabies virus + leptospira
QI07AL02 Rabies virus + canine parvovirus + leptospira
QI07AL03 Canine distemper virus + canine adenovirus + canine parvovirus + rabies virus + leptospira
QI07AL04 Canine parvovirus + leptospira
QI07AL05 Bordetella + canine parainfluenza virus

=== QI07AM Antisera, immunoglobulin preparations, and antitoxins ===
QI07AM01 Canine distemper antiserum + canine adenovirus antiserum + canine parvovirus antiserum + leptospira antiserum
QI07AM02 Anti lipopolysacharide antiserum
QI07AM03 Canine distemper antiserum + canine adenovirus antiserum + canine parvovirus antiserum

=== QI07AN Live parasitic vaccines ===
Empty group

=== QI07AO Inactivated parasitic vaccines ===
QI07AO01 Leishmania

=== QI07AP Live fungal vaccines ===
Empty group

=== QI07AQ Inactivated fungal vaccines ===
QI07AQ01 Trichophyton + microsporum
QI07AQ02 Microsporum vaccine

=== QI07AR In vivo diagnostic preparations ===
Empty group

=== QI07AS Allergens ===
Empty group

=== QI07AT Colostrum preparations and substitutes ===
Empty group

=== QI07AU Other live vaccines ===
Empty group

=== QI07AV Other inactivated vaccines ===
QI07AV01 Staphylococcus + bacteriophage

=== QI07AX Other immunologicals ===
Empty group

== QI07B Fox ==
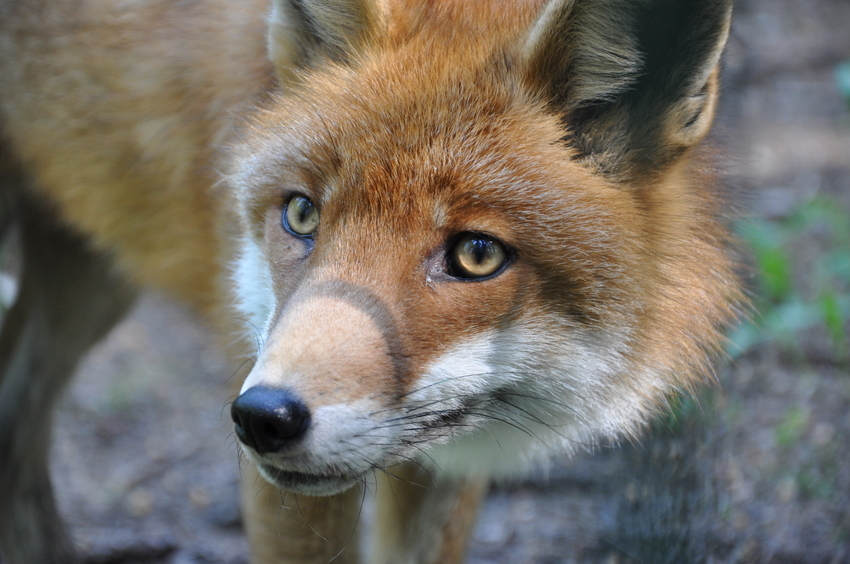

=== QI07BA Inactivated viral vaccines ===
Empty group

=== QI07BB Inactivated bacterial vaccines (including mycoplasma, toxoid and chlamydia) ===
Empty group

=== QI07BC Inactivated bacterial vaccines and antisera ===
Empty group

=== QI07BD Live viral vaccines ===
Empty group

=== QI07BE Live bacterial vaccines ===
Empty group

=== QI07BF Live bacterial and viral vaccines ===
Empty group

=== QI07BG Live and inactivated bacterial vaccines ===
Empty group

=== QI07BH Live and inactivated viral vaccines ===
Empty group

=== QI07BI Live viral and inactivated bacterial vaccines ===
Empty group

=== QI07BJ Live and inactivated viral and bacterial vaccines ===
Empty group

=== QI07BK Inactivated viral and live bacterial vaccines ===
Empty group

=== QI07BL Inactivated viral and inactivated bacterial vaccines ===
Empty group

=== QI07BM Antisera, immunoglobulin preparations, and antitoxins ===
Empty group

=== QI07BN Live parasitic vaccines ===
Empty group

=== QI07BO Inactivated parasitic vaccines ===
Empty group

=== QI07BP Live fungal vaccines ===
Empty group

=== QI07BQ Inactivated fungal vaccines ===
Empty group

=== QI07BR In vivo diagnostic preparations ===
Empty group

=== QI07BS Allergens ===
Empty group

=== QI07BT Colostrum preparations and substitutes ===
Empty group

=== QI07BU Other live vaccines ===
Empty group

=== QI07BV Other inactivated vaccines ===
Empty group

=== QI07BX Other immunologicals ===
Empty group

== QI07X Canidae, others ==
=== QI07XA Inactivated viral vaccines ===
Empty group

=== QI07XB Inactivated bacterial vaccines (including mycoplasma, toxoid and chlamydia) ===
Empty group

=== QI07XC Inactivated bacterial vaccines and antisera ===
Empty group

=== QI07XD Live viral vaccines ===
Empty group

=== QI07XE Live bacterial vaccines ===
Empty group

=== QI07XF Live bacterial and viral vaccines ===
Empty group

=== QI07XG Live and inactivated bacterial vaccines ===
Empty group

=== QI07XH Live and inactivated viral vaccines ===
Empty group

=== QI07XI Live viral and inactivated bacterial vaccines ===
Empty group

=== QI07XJ Live and inactivated viral and bacterial vaccines ===
Empty group

=== QI07XK Inactivated viral and live bacterial vaccines ===
Empty group

=== QI07XL Inactivated viral and inactivated bacterial vaccines ===
Empty group

=== QI07XM Antisera, immunoglobulin preparations, and antitoxins ===
Empty group

=== QI07XN Live parasitic vaccines ===
Empty group

=== QI07XO Inactivated parasitic vaccines ===
Empty group

=== QI07XP Live fungal vaccines ===
Empty group

=== QI07XQ Inactivated fungal vaccines ===
Empty group

=== QI07XR In vivo diagnostic preparations ===
Empty group

=== QI07XS Allergens ===
Empty group

=== QI07XT Colostrum preparations and substitutes ===
Empty group

=== QI07XU Other live vaccines ===
Empty group

=== QI07XV Other inactivated vaccines ===
Empty group

=== QI07XX Other immunologicals ===
Empty group

== See also ==
- Vaccination of dogs
