= Duck coronavirus 2714 =

Virus classification
- (unranked): Virus
- Realm: Riboviria
- Kingdom: Orthornavirae
- Phylum: Pisuviricota
- Class: Pisoniviricetes
- Order: Nidovirales
- Family: Coronaviridae
- Genus: Gammacoronavirus
- Subgenus: Igacovirus
- Species: Gammacoronavirus anatis

Species of virus

Duck coronavirus 2714 (Gammacoronavirus anatis) is a species of coronavirus in the genus Gammacoronavirus.
