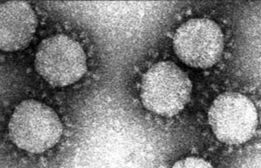
- Electron micrograph of Alphacoronavirus suis of pig (transmissible gastroenteritis coronavirus)

Virus classification
- (unranked): Virus
- Realm: Riboviria
- Kingdom: Orthornavirae
- Phylum: Pisuviricota
- Class: Pisoniviricetes
- Order: Nidovirales
- Family: Coronaviridae
- Genus: Alphacoronavirus
- Subgenus: Tegacovirus
- Species: Alphacoronavirus suis

Member viruses
- Feline coronavirus; Canine coronavirus; Transmissible gastroenteritis virus

Synonyms
- Alphacoronavirus 1

= Alphacoronavirus 1 =

Alphacoronavirus suis

Species of virus

Alphacoronavirus suis, also called Alphacoronavirus 1, is a species of coronavirus that infects cats, dogs and pigs. It includes the virus strains feline coronavirus, canine coronavirus, and transmissible gastroenteritis virus. It is an enveloped, positive-strand RNA virus which is able to enter its host cell by binding to the APN receptor.

Member viruses were first recognised as viruses that caused transmissible gastroenteritis in pigs in 1965. It was originally named porcine transmissible gastroenteritis virus in 1976. After subsequent discovery of canine coronavirus in dogs and feline coronavirus in cats, the three virus species were merged into a single species in 2009. The strain canine coronavirus-HuPn-2018 has been identified in a small number of human cases.

== Discovery ==
In the mid-1940s there was an outbreak of pig disease in US, called transmissible gastroenteritis, which was characterised mainly by diarrhoea and vomiting. It was suspected to be a viral infection and was highly fatal among young pigs. Leo P. Doyle and L. M. Hutchings reported the case in the Journal of the American Veterinary Medical Association in 1946. The virus was identified and isolated by A. W. McClurkin in 1965. The International Committee for the Nomenclature of Viruses (ICNV, later renamed International Committee on Taxonomy of Viruses, ICTV, in 1975) accepted the scientific named Transmissible gastro-enteritis virus of swine in its first report in 1971, but renamed it Porcine transmissible gastroenteritis virus (PTGV) in its second report in 1976.

There was another case of coronavirus infection in cats in 1966. The virus caused inflammation of the abdomen (peritonitis) and was highly fatal. The virus was identified in 1968, and was named as Feline infectious peritonitis virus by ICTV in 1991. It was again renamed Feline coronavirus in 1999. In 1974 there was an outbreak of viral infection among US military dogs. The virus was identified as a coronavirus and the formal name Canine coronavirus was adopted by ICTV in 1991. As the molecular and antigenic relationship of the three viruses were later established in the late 1980s, ICTV merged them into a single species Alphacoronavirus 1 in 2009, and in 2024 the species was renamed Alphacoronavirus suis.
