= Avian coronavirus 9203 =

Virus classification
- (unranked): Virus
- Realm: Riboviria
- Kingdom: Orthornavirae
- Phylum: Pisuviricota
- Class: Pisoniviricetes
- Order: Nidovirales
- Family: Coronaviridae
- Genus: Gammacoronavirus
- Subgenus: Igacovirus
- Species: Gammacoronavirus pulli

Species of virus

Avian coronavirus 9203 (Gammacoronavirus pulli) is a species of coronavirus in the genus Gammacoronavirus.
