= Beluga whale coronavirus SW1 =

Virus classification
- (unranked): Virus
- Realm: Riboviria
- Kingdom: Orthornavirae
- Phylum: Pisuviricota
- Class: Pisoniviricetes
- Order: Nidovirales
- Family: Coronaviridae
- Genus: Gammacoronavirus
- Subgenus: Cegacovirus
- Species: Gammacoronavirus delphinapteri

Species of virus

Beluga whale coronavirus SW1 (Whale-CoV SW1) is a mammalian Gammacoronavirus, an RNA virus, discovered through genome sequencing in the liver of a single deceased beluga whale and first described in 2008. This was the first description of the complete genome of a coronavirus found in a marine mammal.

The captive-born whale was male and died at age 13 after a short illness. This illness was characterised by generalised pulmonary disease and terminal acute liver failure. The liver demonstrated pathological signs, including areas of necrosis. Electron microscopy showed many round viral particles measuring around 60–80nm in the liver cytoplasm, but it could not be confirmed whether these corresponded with the RNA identified. It is not known whether the beluga is the natural host of this virus or whether the virus is pathogenic in whales. Other coronaviruses can cause liver pathologies, but it could not be confirmed whether that was the case here.

A genetic analysis showed the virus to be highly divergent, but closest to the Gammacoronavirus group.

A closely related virus was subsequently reported in bottlenose dolphins, with the authors proposing that both should be included in the same species, Cetacean coronavirus. In 2022 this paper was retracted due to suspected data manipulation, with the original data being unverifiable.

== See also ==
- Animal viruses
- Avian infectious bronchitis virus
- RNA virus
