= Nsp12 =

Protein in the Coronavirus genome

Nsp12 is a non-structural protein in the Coronavirus genome. Its gene is part of the ORF1ab reading frame and it is part of the pp1ab polyprotein; it is cleaved by 3CL^{pro}.

Nsp12 is a multi-domain subunit: it consists of an N-terminal nidovirus-specific extension (NiRAN) domain, an interface domain, and a C-terminal RNA-dependent RNA-polymerase domain. The N-terminal portion of SARS-CoV-2 nsp12 additionally contains a β-hairpin which is sandwiched between the NiRAN and RdRp domain.

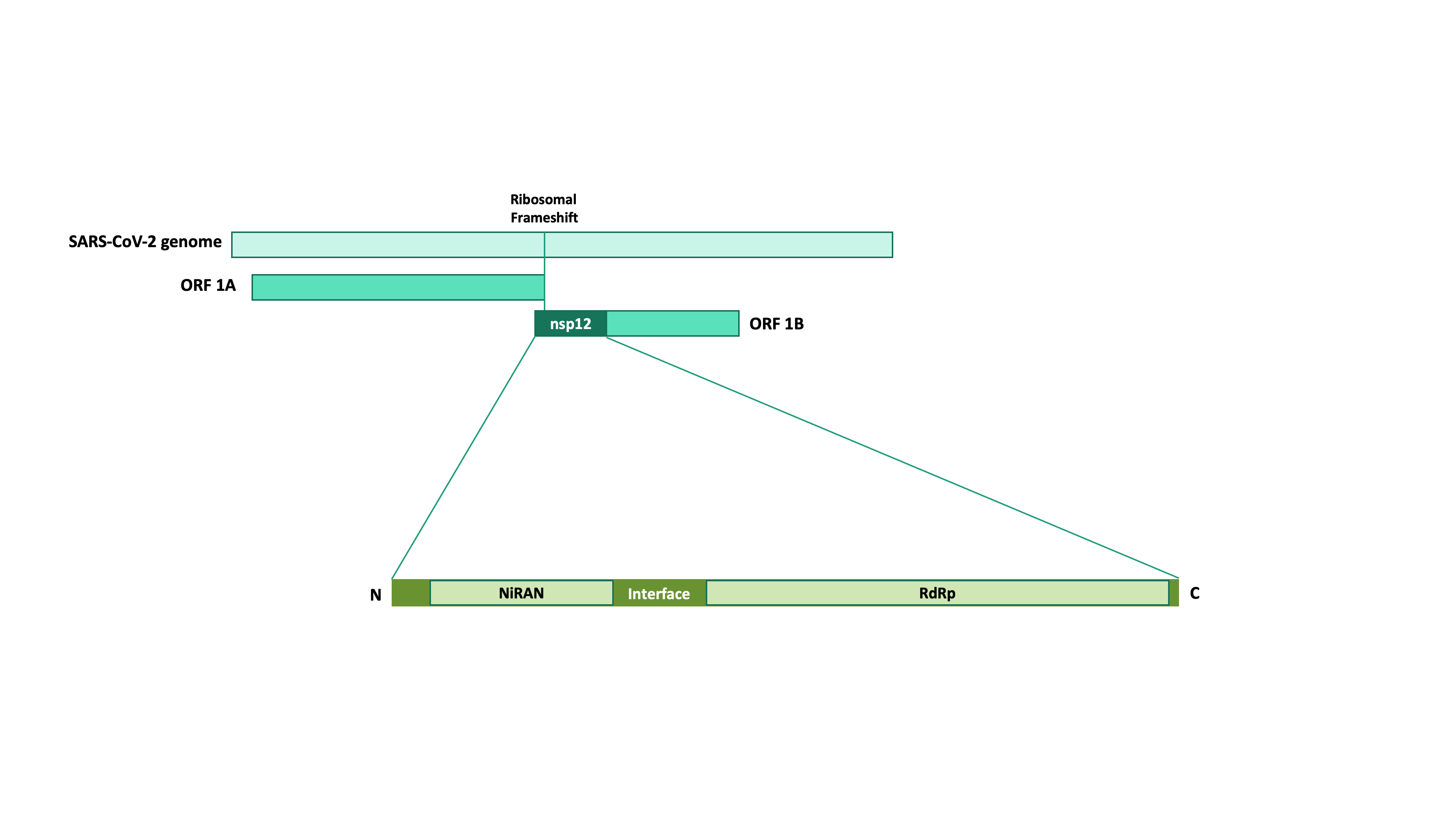
A representation of the SARS genome with ORF1A, ORF1AB, and the ribosomal frameshift shown. Coronavirus nsp12 is identified and expanded; RdRp, NiRAN domains as well as the interface domain are identified.

Coronavirus nsp12 also plays a role in host immune evasion; research has demonstrated that nsp12 inhibits the nuclear translocation of IRF3.

== RdRp Domain ==
The RNA-dependent RNA polymerase domain of nsp12 is C-terminal. In SARS-CoV-2 the domain spans residues 366 to 920. The structure of the RdRp domain shares common structural features with eukaryotic RNA polymerases: the structure consists of a cupped right hand with subdomains referred to as fingers, palms, and thumbs. RdRp activity is dependent on two key zinc ions and conserved metal binding motifs of a histidine and two cysteines each.

The active site has seven catalytic motifs that are labeled A through G. Motif B serves as a hinge which allows the active site to associate with template RNA and Motif F directly interacts with the phosphate group of incoming free nucleotides.

RdRp has to interact with RNA, which is negatively charged, so multiple subdomains including the primer-template entry site, NTP entry site, and the RNA strand exit routes contain positively charged residues. RdRp is unique from host RNA polymerases in that it has to associate with RNA instead of DNA, many RdRp residues interact with RNA bases via 2’-OH groups on the ribose ring which provides a possibly structural explanation for its specificity for RNA.

Coronavirus nsp12 cannot function independently; it has two essential cofactor proteins, nsp7 and nsp8, that form a Replication and Transcription Complex (RTC). Structural studies of the RTC indicate that nsp7 and nsp8 form an 8:8 hexadecamer which acts as a primase to initiate viral replication.

While nsp12 is relatively well conserved across the Coronavirus viral species, there are biochemical and structural differences between the RdRp domain of SARS-CoV and SARS-CoV-2. SARS-CoV-2 RdRp has lower enzymatic activity and lower thermal stability compared to the RdRp domain in SARS-CoV.

=== Targeting by Remdesivir ===
Nsp12 is researched as a target for antiviral drugs as it is highly structurally conserved across related viruses and strains, and there are no human proteins with close structural homology. The emergence of SARS-CoV-2 and associated COVID19 disease led to the investigation of Remdesivir as an antiviral drug for SARS-CoV-2. Remdesivir is a nucleoside analog which can compete with ATP for incorporation into the RNA strand and prematurely terminate RNA synthesis.

== NiRAN Domain ==
Coronavirus nsp12 has an N-terminal nidovirus RdRp-associated nucleotidyltransferase (NiRAN) domain which is essential for viral replication. The NiRAN domain is capable of transferring nucleotides as functional groups and it contains three key motifs called A, B, and C with seven invariant residues.

The biological function of the nsp12 NiRAN domain is not as well characterized as RdRp, but recent research has elucidated a possible role for the NiRAN domain in viral RNA capping. An additional non-structural protein, nsp9, was shown to associate with nsp12. The biologically active form of nsp9 was additionally shown to be capable of binding nucleic acids with a preference for single-stranded RNA and could cleave nucleotide triphosphates and transfer the resulting nucleotide monophosphates to protein substrates in a process called NMPylation. Park and colleagues demonstrated that the SARS-CoV-2 NiRAN domain could cleave a pyrophosphate from the end of an uncapped RNA genome and transfer the monophosphorylated RNA to nsp9 to RNAylate it. The domain can then transfer the monophosphorylated RNA from nsp9 to a Guanidine Diphosphate (GDP) to form the initial cap structure for SARS-CoV-2.
