= Gammacoronavirus =

Virus classification
- (unranked): Virus
- Realm: Riboviria
- Kingdom: Orthornavirae
- Phylum: Pisuviricota
- Class: Pisoniviricetes
- Order: Nidovirales
- Family: Coronaviridae
- Subfamily: Orthocoronavirinae
- Genus: Gammacoronavirus

Genus of viruses

Gammacoronavirus (Gamma-CoV) is one of the four genera (Alpha-, Beta-, Gamma-, and Delta-) of coronaviruses. It is in the subfamily Orthocoronavirinae of the family Coronaviridae. They are enveloped, positive-sense, single-stranded RNA viruses of zoonotic origin. Coronaviruses infect both animals and humans.

While the alpha and beta genera are derived from the bat gene pool, the gamma and delta genera are derived from the avian and pig gene pools. Gamma-CoV also known as coronavirus group 3 are the avian coronaviruses.

== Taxonomy ==
The genus contains the following subgenera and species:

- Subgenus: Brangacovirus
  - Gammacoronavirus brantae, Goose coronavirus CB17
- Subgenus: Cegacovirus
  - Gammacoronavirus delphinapteri, Beluga whale coronavirus SW1
- Subgenus: Igacovirus
  - Gammacoronavirus anatis, Duck coronavirus 2714
  - Gammacoronavirus galli, Infectious bronchitis virus
  - Gammacoronavirus pulli, Avian coronavirus 9203

== See also ==
- Animal viruses
- Positive/negative-sense
- RNA virus
