= Brangacovirus =

Virus classification
- (unranked): Virus
- Realm: Riboviria
- Kingdom: Orthornavirae
- Phylum: Pisuviricota
- Class: Pisoniviricetes
- Order: Nidovirales
- Family: Coronaviridae
- Genus: Gammacoronavirus
- Subgenus: Brangacovirus
- Species: Gammacoronavirus brantae

Subgenus of viruses

Brangacovirus is a subgenus of viruses in the genus Gammacoronavirus, consisting of a single species, Goose coronavirus CB17 (Gammacoronavirus brantae).
