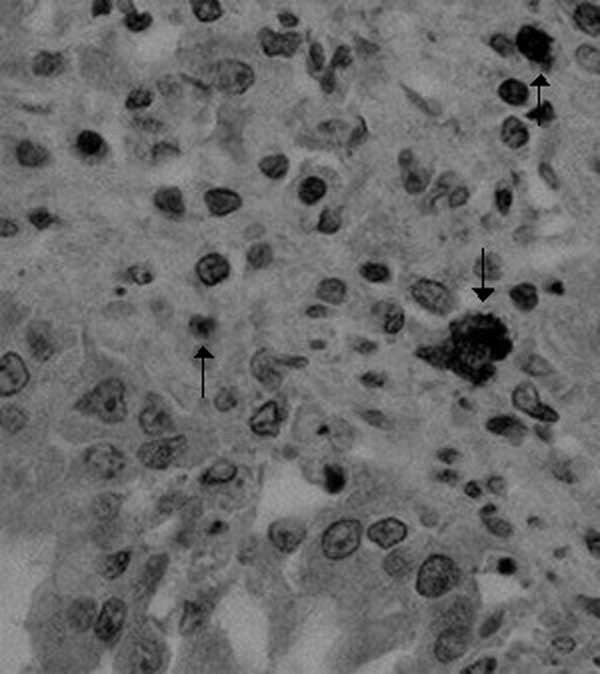
- Canine coronavirus antigen (arrows) in canine lung tissue

Virus classification
- (unranked): Virus
- Realm: Riboviria
- Kingdom: Orthornavirae
- Phylum: Pisuviricota
- Class: Pisoniviricetes
- Order: Nidovirales
- Family: Coronaviridae
- Genus: Alphacoronavirus
- Subgenus: Tegacovirus
- Species: Alphacoronavirus suis
- Virus: Canine coronavirus

Strains
- Canine coronavirus type I; Canine coronavirus strain Elmo/02; Canine coronavirus type II; Canine coronavirus strain NTU336/F/2008

= Canine coronavirus =

Species of virus

Canine coronavirus (CCoV) is an enveloped, positive-sense, single-stranded RNA virus which is a member of the species Alphacoronavirus suis. It is distributed world wide and may cause intestinal disease in dogs. The infecting virus enters its host cell by binding to the APN receptor. It was discovered in 1971 in Germany during an outbreak in sentry dogs. The virus is a member of the genus Alphacoronavirus and subgenus Tegacovirus.

== Canine enteric coronavirus ==
=== Pathology ===
The virus invades and replicates in the villi of the small intestine. Intestinal disease may be related to virus-induced apoptosis (programmed cell death) of cells of the epithelial mucosa of the small intestine. Canine coronavirus was originally thought to cause serious gastrointestinal disease, but now most cases are considered to be very mild or without symptoms. A more serious complication of canine coronavirus occurs when the dog is also infected with canine parvovirus. Coronavirus infection of the intestinal villi makes the cells more susceptible to parvovirus infection. This causes a much more severe disease than either virus can separately. However, fatal intestinal disease associated with canine coronavirus without the presence of canine parvovirus is still occasionally reported. This may be related to the high mutation rate of RNA positive stranded viruses, of which canine coronavirus is one.

=== Symptoms, diagnosis, treatment, and control ===
The incubation period is one to three days. The disease is highly contagious and is spread through the feces of infected dogs, who usually shed the virus for six to nine days, but sometimes for six months following infection. Symptoms include diarrhea, vomiting, and anorexia. Diagnosis is through detection of virus particles in the feces. Treatment usually only requires medication for diarrhea, but more severely affected dogs may require intravenous fluids for dehydration. Fatalities are rare. The virus is destroyed by most available disinfectants. There is a vaccine available (ATCvet code: QI07AD11 (WHO)), however, evidence suggests its use may be very limited to specific cases. It is generally not recommended for use, due to questions around its efficacy and the general timing of most vaccinations. It was historically recommended in puppies and show dogs.

== Canine respiratory coronavirus ==
A second type of canine coronavirus (Group II) has been shown to cause respiratory disease in dogs. Known as canine respiratory coronavirus (CRCoV) and found to be similar to strain OC43 of bovine and human coronaviruses, it was first isolated in the United Kingdom in 2003 from lung samples of dogs and has since been found on the European mainland and in Japan. A serological study in 2006 has also shown antibodies to CRCoV to be present in dogs in Canada and the United States. However, a retrospective study in Saskatchewan found that CRCoV may have been present there as far back as 1996.

== Human infection ==
A study published on May 20, 2021, analyzed samples from eight patients with pneumonia (seven of whom were children) in hospitals of Sibu and Kapit, Malaysia, taken between 2017 and 2018 and found a novel coronavirus. This coronavirus is a species of Canine coronavirus (CCoV) which was named CCoV-HuPn-2018 and was found to have multiple similarities to feline coronavirus, swine transmissible gastroenteritis virus and some human and SARS-like coronaviruses. Most of these affect the spike protein and it is thought the virus could have undergone genetic recombination to achieve those traits. If this strain is confirmed to be associated with human disease then it would become the eighth known coronavirus to cause disease in humans.

== See also ==
- Alphacoronavirus 1
