= Feline coronavirus =

Virus classification
- (unranked): Virus
- Realm: Riboviria
- Kingdom: Orthornavirae
- Phylum: Pisuviricota
- Class: Pisoniviricetes
- Order: Nidovirales
- Family: Coronaviridae
- Genus: Alphacoronavirus
- Subgenus: Tegacovirus
- Species: Alphacoronavirus suis
- Virus: Feline coronavirus

Strains
- Feline coronavirus C1Je; Feline coronavirus type I; Feline coronavirus type II; Feline infectious peritonitis virus WSU 79-1146

Species of virus

Feline coronavirus (FCoV) is a positive-stranded RNA virus that infects cats worldwide. It is a coronavirus of the species Alphacoronavirus suis, which includes canine coronavirus (CCoV) and porcine transmissible gastroenteritis coronavirus (TGEV). FCoV has two different forms: feline enteric coronavirus (FECV), which infects the intestines, and feline infectious peritonitis virus (FIPV), which causes the disease feline infectious peritonitis (FIP).

Feline coronavirus is typically shed in faeces by healthy cats, and transmitted by the fecal-oral route to other cats. In environments with multiple cats, the transmission rate is much higher compared to single-cat environments. The virus is insignificant until mutations cause it to be transformed from FECV to FIPV. FIPV causes feline infectious peritonitis, for which treatment is generally symptomatic and palliative only. The drug GS-441524 shows promise as an antiviral treatment for FIP, but at the moment it still requires further research. The drug GC376 is also being studied and developed.

== Prevalence ==
Feline coronavirus is found in cat populations around the world. The only known exceptions are on the Falkland Islands and the Galapagos, where studies found no occurrences of FCoV antibodies in cats tested.

== Virology ==
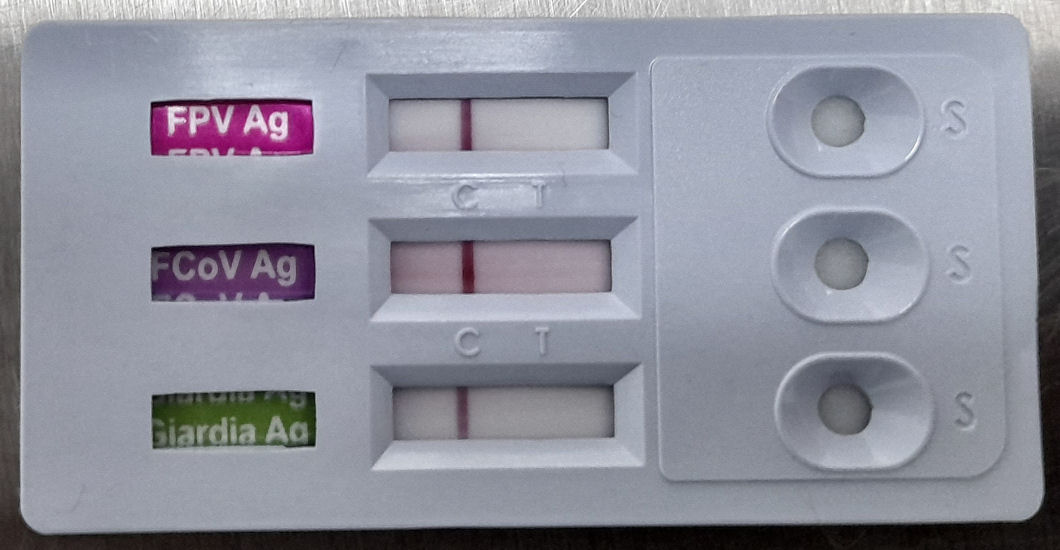
A test kit for the cats

=== Feline enteric coronavirus (FECV) ===
Feline enteric coronavirus is responsible for an infection of the mature gastrointestinal epithelial cells (see also enterocytes, brush border, microvilli, villi). This intestinal infection has few outward signs, and is usually chronic. The virus is excreted in the feces of the healthy carrier, and can be detected by polymerase chain reaction (PCR) of feces or by PCR testing of rectal samples.

Cats living in groups can infect each other with different strains of the virus during visits to a communal litter tray. Some cats are resistant to the virus and can avoid infection or even becoming carriers, while others may become FECV carriers.

=== Feline infectious peritonitis virus (FIPV) and Feline infectious peritonitis ===
The virus becomes feline infectious peritonitis virus (FIPV) when random errors occur in the virus infecting an enterocyte, causing the virus to mutate from FECV to FIPV.

In their pre-domestication natural state, cats are solitary animals and do not share space (hunting areas, rest areas, defecation sites, etc.). Domestic cats living in a group therefore have a much higher epidemiological risk of mutation. After this mutation, the FCoV acquires a tropism for macrophages, while losing intestinal tropism.

In a large group of cats, n, the epidemiological risk of mutation (E) is higher and expressed theoretically as: E = n^{2} −n. A house hosting 2 cats therefore has risk of mutation E = 2. When 4 kittens (6 cats in total) are born into this house, the risk increases from 2 to 30 (6^{2}−6). Overcrowding increases the risk of mutation and conversion from FECV to FIPV, which constitutes a major risk factor for the development of feline infectious peritonitis (FIP) cases. FIP has been shown to develop in cats whose immunity is low; such as younger kittens, old cats, immunosuppression due to viral—FIV (feline immunodeficiency virus) and/or FeLV (feline leukemia virus) and stress, including the stress of separation and adoption.

Infection of macrophages by FIPV is responsible for development of a fatal granulomatous vasculitis, or FIP (see granuloma). Development of FIP depends on two factors: virus mutation and low immunity where virus mutation depends on the rate of mutation of FECV to FIPV and the immune status depends on the age, the genetic pool and the stress level. High immune status will be more effective at slowing down the virus.

== Molecular biology ==
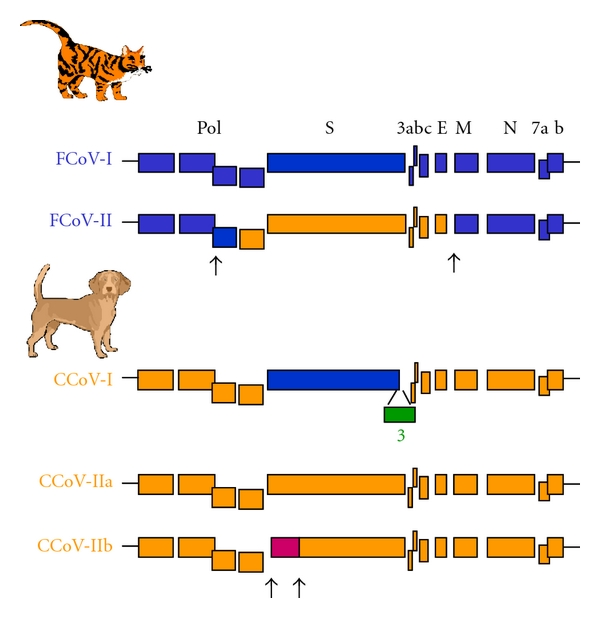
Genetic relationships between the different feline coronaviruses (FCov) and canine coronaviruses (CCoV) genotypes. Recombination at arrows.

Two forms of feline coronavirus are found in nature: enteric (FECV) and FIP (FIPV). There are also two different serotypes found with different antigens that produce unique antibodies. FCoV serotype I (also called type I) is the most frequent. Type I, that can be defined as 'FECV that could mutate to FIPV type I', is responsible for 80% of the infections. Typically, serotype I FCoV cultures are difficult to perform, with few resulting studies. FCoV serotype II (also called type II) is less frequent and is described as 'FECV type II that can mutate to FIPV type II.' FCoV type II is a recombinant virus type I with spike genes (S protein) replacement from FCoV by the canine coronavirus (CCoV) spikes.

More recent research points to a common ancestor between FCoV and CCoV. This ancestor gradually evolved into FCoV I. An S protein from a yet-unknown virus was passed into the ancestor and gave rise to CCoV, whose S protein was again recombined into FCoV I to form FCoV II. CCoV gradually evolved into TGEV.

=== FCoV type II ===
==== Virus fusion ====
Coronaviruses are covered with several types of "S proteins" (or E2) forming a crown of protein spikes on the surface of the virus. Coronaviruses take their name from the observation of this crown by electron microscopy. These spikes of Cov (group 1 and serotype II) are responsible for the infection power of the virus by binding the virus particle to a membrane receptor of the host cell—the Feline Amino peptidase N (fAPN).

==== The viral receptor: aminopeptidase N (APN) ====
fAPN (feline), hAPN (human) and pAPN (porcine) differ in some areas of N-glycosylation. All strains of the coronavirus study group 1 (feline, porcine and human) can bind to the feline aminopeptidase N fapn but the human coronavirus can bind to the human APN (HAPN) but not to the porcine type receptor (pAPN) and the pig coronavirus can bind to the porcine APN (pAPN) but not the human type receptor (hAPN). At the cellular level the glycosylation level of enterocytes APN is important for the binding of virus to the receptor.

==== Viral spikes ====
The FECV spikes have a high affinity for enterocytes fAPN, while the mutant FIPV spikes have a high affinity for the macrophages fAPN. During the viral replication cycle, spikes proteins mature in the host cell Golgi complex with a high mannose glycosylation. This spike manno-glycosylation stage is vital for the acquisition of coronavirus virality.

=== Molecular model of FCoV type I ===
==== The receptor ====
In 2007, it was well established that serotype I did not work with the FCoV fAPN receptor. The FCoV type I receptor still is unknown.

==== CoV receptors ====
The human CoV SARS binds to the angiotensin-converting enzyme ACE II. The ACE II is also called L-SIGN (liver/lymph node-specific intracellular adhesion molecules-3 grabbing non-integrin). Coronaviruses bind to macrophages via the Dendritic Cell-Specific Intercellular adhesion molecule-3-Grabbing Non-integrin (DC-SIGN) which is a trans-membrane protein encoded in humans by the CD209 gene. ACE and DC-SIGN are two trans-membrane retrovirus receptors (mannose receptors) which can bind "the plant lectins C-type mannose binding domain".

Aminopeptidase N has the same ability to interact with plant lectins C-type mannose-binding and also serves as a receptor for a retrovirus. Angiotensin-converting enzyme ACE, aminopeptidase A and aminopeptidase N have cascading actions in the renin-angiotensin-aldosterone system, which suggests a common phylogenetic origin between these molecules. Some advanced studies have shown a high homology between the Aminopeptidase N and the Angiotensin-converting enzyme.

=== Interactions between the viruses and sialic acid ===
Extensive data also shows that processes using sialic acid are directly involved in the interaction with the receptor's lectins. It has also been demonstrated that swine enteric coronavirus (group 1) fusion to the enterocyte is accomplished via binding to the APN in the presence of the sialic acid. Feline coronavirus infections are therefore sialic acid dependent.

The Porcine epidemic diarrhea virus (PEDV) S protein is 45% identical to FCoV type I spike. An EM structure of it shows sialic acid binding sites. The PEDV receptor is also unknown.

== Effects of breast milk on kittens ==
=== Colostrum ===
Other molecules from colostrum and cat milk, could also bear this coverage: lactoferrin, lactoperoxidase, lysozyme, rich proline polypeptide — PRP and alpha-lactalbumine. Lactoferrin has many properties that make it a very good candidate for this anti-coronavirus activity:

1. For FCoV group II, it binds to APN.
2. For SARS CoV, it binds to ACEs
3. It also binds to DC-SIGN of macrophages,
4. The lactoferrin anti-viral activity is sialic-acid–dependent.

The structures of the polypeptide chain and carbohydrate moieties of bovine lactoferrin (bLF) are well established. bLF consists of a 689-amino acid polypeptide chain to which complex and high-mannose-type glycans are linked.

=== Other components ===
The colostrum and breast milk also contain:

1. Many oligosaccharides (glycan) which are known for their anti-viral properties which is thought to be primarily due to their inhibition of pathogen binding to host cell ligands.
2. Many maternal immune cells.
3. Many cytokines (interferon, etc.), whose role by oro-mucosal route seems very important.
4. Sialic acid: during lactation, neutralizing oligo-saccharides binding sialic acid decreases when it binds increasingly to glycoproteins. (The APN is a glycoprotein.) The anti-viral effect of lactoferrin is increased by the removal of sialic acid.
5. Mannan-binding lectins.

=== Other protective factors ===
Other assumptions may help to explain this resistance to FCoV infections by kittens. In the first weeks of life, APN could be immature because highly manno-glycosylated. The spikes of CoV could then not be bound. Factors in breastmilk may inhibit the synthesis of fANP by enterocytes, as already described with fructose or sucrose.

== See also ==
- Alphacoronavirus 1
