= Alanine aminopeptidase =

Mammalian protein found in Homo sapiens

ANPEP
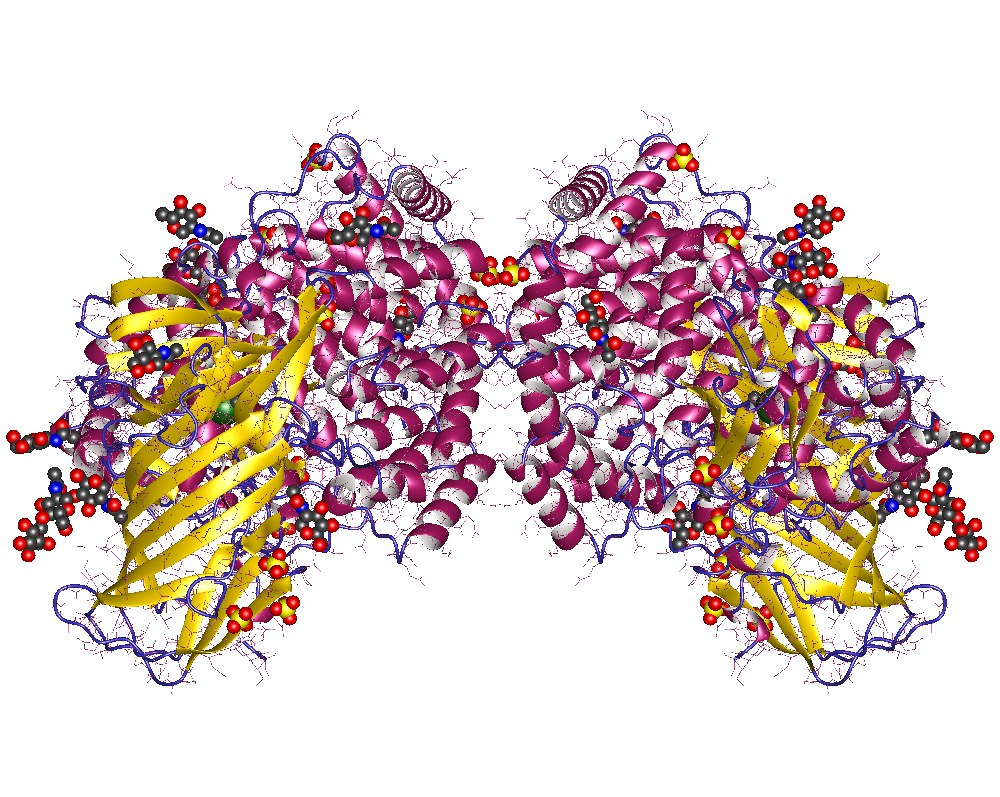

Identifiers
- Aliases: ANPEP, APN, CD13, GP150, LAP1, P150, PEPN, alanyl aminopeptidase, membrane, AP-M, hAPN, AP-N
- External IDs: OMIM: 151530; MGI: 5000466; GeneCards: ANPEP
Available structures
PDB	Ortholog search: PDBe RCSB
PDB	List of PDB id codes 4FYQ, 4FYR, 4FYS, 4FYT
Enzyme activity
EC #	BRENDA	ExPASy	KEGG	MetaCyc
3.4.11.2	↗	↗	↗	↗

Gene location (Human)
Chr.	Chromosome 15 (human)
Band	15q26.1	Start	89,784,895 bp
Band	15q26.1	End	89,815,401 bp

Gene location (Mouse)
Chr.	Chromosome 7 (mouse)
Band	7|7 D2	Start	79,471,551 bp
Band	7|7 D2	End	79,510,807 bp
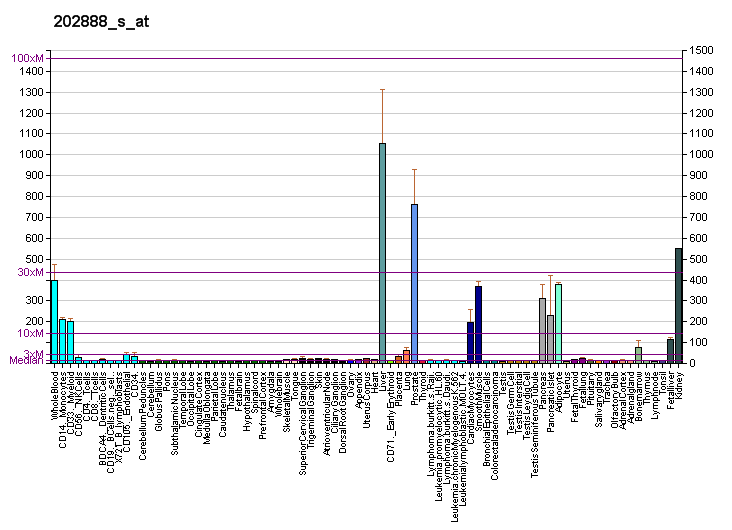
RNA expression pattern
Bgee	Human / Mouse (ortholog); Top expressed in: jejunal mucosa; duodenum; body of pancreas; mucosa of ileum; mucosa of transverse colon; right lobe of liver; stromal cell of endometrium; gallbladder; human kidney; blood / Top expressed in: jejunum; duodenum; ileum; crypt of lieberkuhn of small intestine; lactiferous gland; lip; right lobe of liver; epithelium of stomach; lacrimal gland; aortic valve; More reference expression data
BioGPS	More reference expression data
Gene ontology
Molecular function	virus receptor activity; zinc ion binding; metalloaminopeptidase activity; hydrolase activity; metal ion binding; peptidase activity; aminopeptidase activity; metallopeptidase activity; peptide binding; signaling receptor activity
Cellular component	lysosomal membrane; integral component of membrane; membrane; endoplasmic reticulum-Golgi intermediate compartment; external side of plasma membrane; extracellular exosome; extracellular space; nucleus; plasma membrane; secretory granule membrane; cytoplasm
Biological process	viral process; peptide catabolic process; proteolysis; viral entry into host cell; multicellular organism development; cell differentiation; angiogenesis; neutrophil degranulation; signal transduction; cell-cell signaling; regulation of blood pressure
Sources:Amigo / QuickGO
Orthologs
Databases	NCBI: entry; OMA: entry
Species	Human	Mouse
Entrez	290	16790
Ensembl	ENSG00000166825	ENSMUSG00000039062
UniProt	P15144	P97449
RefSeq (mRNA)	NM_001150; NM_001381923; NM_001381924	NM_008486
RefSeq (protein)	NP_001141; NP_001368852; NP_001368853	NP_032512
Location (UCSC)	Chr 15: 89.78 – 89.82 Mb	Chr 7: 79.47 – 79.51 Mb
PubMed search
- Wikidata
View/Edit Human	View/Edit Mouse

Membrane alanyl aminopeptidase (EC 3.4.11.2) also known as alanyl aminopeptidase (AAP) or aminopeptidase N (AP-N) is an enzyme that in humans is encoded by the ANPEP gene.

== Function ==
Aminopeptidase N is located in the small-intestinal and renal microvillar membrane, and also in other plasma membranes. In the small intestine aminopeptidase N plays a role in the final digestion of peptides generated from hydrolysis of proteins by gastric and pancreatic proteases. Its function in proximal tubular epithelial cells and other cell types is less clear. The large extracellular carboxyterminal domain contains a pentapeptide consensus sequence characteristic of members of the zinc-binding metalloproteinase superfamily. Sequence comparisons with known enzymes of this class showed that CD13 and aminopeptidase N are identical. The latter enzyme was thought to be involved in the metabolism of regulatory peptides by diverse cell types, including small intestinal and renal tubular epithelial cells, macrophages, granulocytes, and synaptic membranes from the CNS.

== Clinical significance ==
Defects in this gene appear to be a cause of various types of leukemia or lymphoma.

AAP is also used by some viruses as a receptor to which these viruses bind to and then enter cells. It is a receptor for human coronavirus 229E, feline coronavirus serotype II (FCoV-II), TGEV, PEDV, canine coronavirus genotype II (CCoV-II) as well as several Deltacoronaviruses. Betacoronaviruses in hedgehogs have also been shown to use aminopeptidase N as an entry receptor.
