= Infectious bronchitis virus =

Virus classification
- (unranked): Virus
- Realm: Riboviria
- Kingdom: Orthornavirae
- Phylum: Pisuviricota
- Class: Pisoniviricetes
- Order: Nidovirales
- Family: Coronaviridae
- Genus: Gammacoronavirus
- Subgenus: Igacovirus
- Species: Gammacoronavirus galli

Synonyms
- Avian coronavirus; Avian infectious bronchitis virus; Infectious bronchitis virus; Turkey coronavirus; Pheasant coronavirus; Duck coronavirus; Goose coronavirus; Pigeon coronavirus

Species of virus

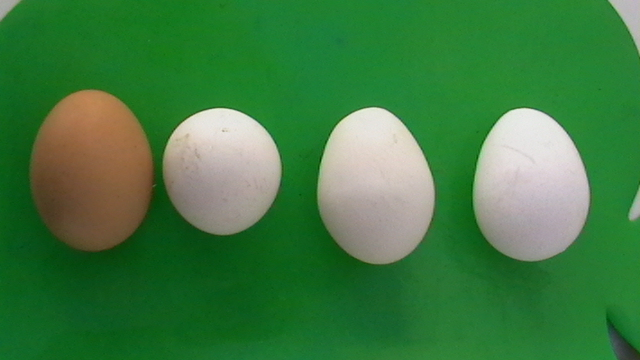
Examples of chicken eggs likely laid by parents infected with Infectious Bronchitis. Notice their discolored and malformed shells.

Infectious bronchitis virus (IBV) is a species of virus from the genus Gammacoronavirus that infects birds. It causes avian infectious bronchitis, a highly infectious disease that affects the respiratory tract, gut, kidney and reproductive system. IBV affects the performance of both meat-producing and egg-producing chickens and is responsible for substantial economic loss within the poultry industry.

== Classification ==
IBV is in the genus Gammacoronavirus, or group 3, with a non-segmented, positive-sense single-stranded RNA genome.

It was previously the type species of its genus Igacovirus. When there was only one genus of coronaviruses, the genus Coronavirus, it was the type species of the group of all known coronaviruses.

== Recombination ==
When two strains of coronavirus IBV infect a host they may recombine during genome replication. Recombination appears to contribute to the genetic variation of the IBV genome found in nature.

== Pathology ==
=== Respiratory system ===
When inhaled, virus will attach to glycoprotein receptors containing sialic acid on ciliated epithelial cells of the respiratory epithelium. The respiratory replication will result in loss of ciliary activity, mucus accumulation, necrosis and desquamation, causing respiratory distress, rales and asphyxia. Local virus replication will result in viremia, spreading the infection into other tissues and organs. Other respiratory diseases of chickens — Mycoplasma gallisepticum infection, avian infectious laryngotracheitis (Gallid alphaherpesvirus 1), Newcastle disease (avian paramyxovirus 1) and Avian metapneumovirus infection — may be confused clinically with infectious bronchitis.

=== Kidney ===
Through viremia, some nephrotropic strains (most of high virulence) could infect the kidney epithelium in tubules and nephron, causing kidney failure. At gross examination, kidneys may appear swollen and pale in color and with urates in the ureters.

=== Reproductive system ===
In hens, the viremic IBV will also reach the oviduct, causing lesions in the magnum (the egg-white gland) and in the uterus (the egg-shell gland), leading to a sharp decline of egg production, shell-less, fragile or roughened-shell eggs (uterus lesion) with watery whites (magnum lesion). Infection of chickens at puberty, during the oviduct development, will impede oviduct formation and destroy future laying capacity, resulting in "false layers". However, other diseases affecting layer chickens could lead to that condition.

== Vaccines ==
There are both attenuated vaccines and inactivated vaccines available. Their effectiveness is diminished by poor cross-protection. The nature of the protective immune response to IBV is poorly understood, but the surface spike protein, the amino-terminal S1 half, is sufficient to induce good protective immunity. Experimental vector IB vaccines and genetically manipulated IBVs—with heterologous spike protein genes—have produced promising results, including in the context of in ovo vaccination.

== See also ==
- Infectious bronchitis virus D-RNA
- Veterinary virology
