= Beef cattle vaccination in Australia =

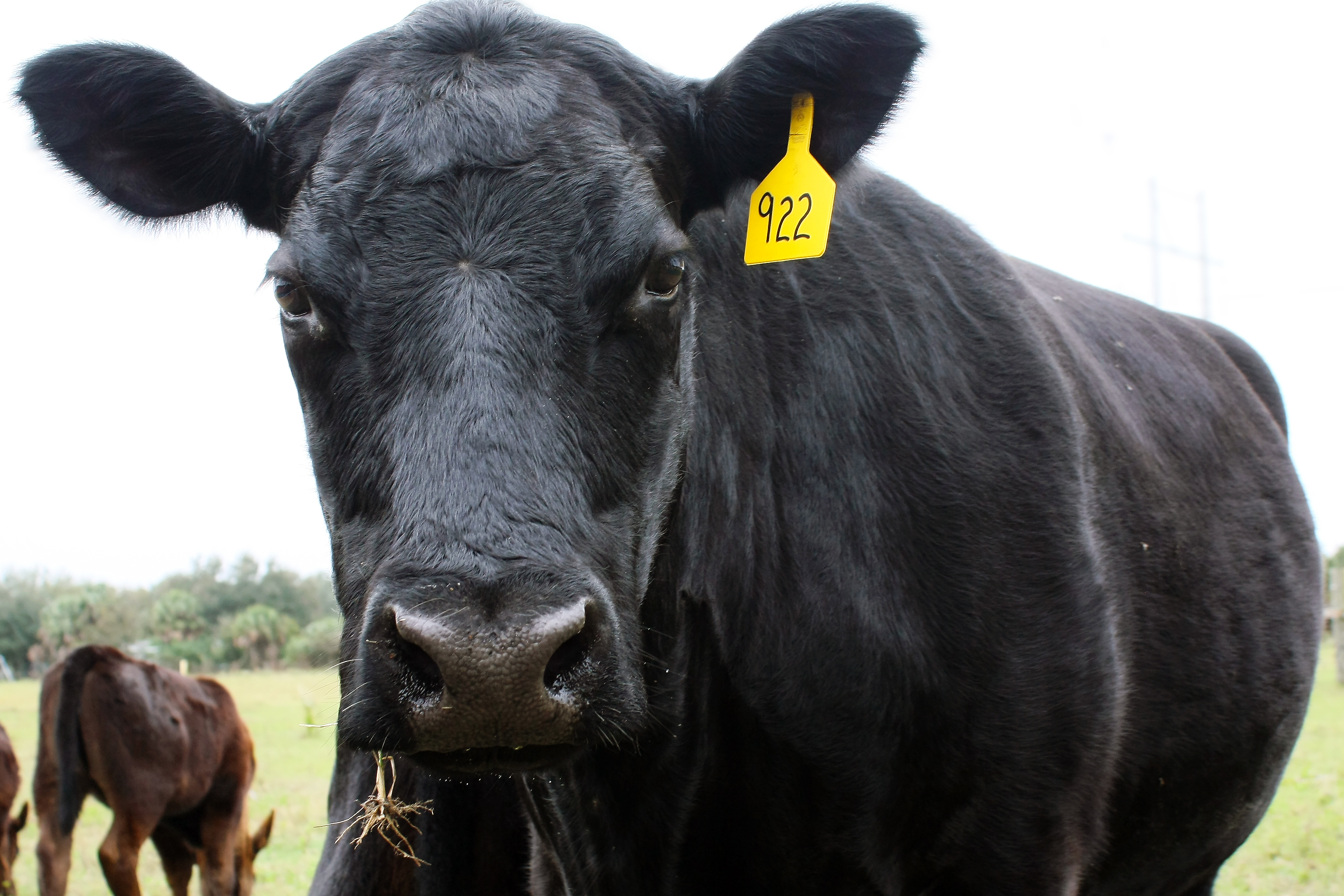
Angus Cattle

Vaccinations for cattle involves the process of applying subcutaneous injections of biological microorganisms in a weakened state to help the immune system develop protection by providing active acquirement of immunity to a particular disease. Cattle are bovine livestock and are thus very susceptible to diseases. Vaccinations for cattle are widely used in the livestock industries of the Australian agriculture sector by farmers to prevent harmful and deadly diseases from infecting their livestock, avoiding any economical or biological harm. Farmed livestock industries account for 45% of the gross value of Australian agricultural output, beef cattle being the largest farmed livestock nationally with around 26.2 million head of cattle nationwide. The beef industry within Australia generates a gross value of approximately $8 billion AUD in beef exports and a total gross value of $11.4 billion in farm production (2017–18). Thus, vaccinations play a vital role in protecting, sustaining and growing the beef cattle industry in the Australian agriculture sector.

== Diseases ==
=== Clostridial ===
Caused by the bacteria Clostridium. There are 6 species of the clostridia disease, they include; Malignant oedema (C. septicum), Tetanus (C. tetani), Blackleg (C. chauvoei), Black disease (C. novyi), Enterotoxaemia/Pulpy kidney (C. perfringens type D) and Botulism (C. botulinum). Young cattle are at a higher risk than adults to these diseases due to marking, castration and dehorning procedures allowing the clostridial diseases to invade.

Tetanus results in the production of a toxin that invades through deep puncture wounds affecting the nervous system, causing stimulation and contraction of skeletal muscles. This leads to 'tetanic' convulsions and eventually respiratory failure. Malignant Oedema is also caused from deep wounds formed during calving. Toxins are produced causing swelling and accumulation of fluids and dead tissue. The toxins are then absorbed into the bloodstream resulting in fever, weakness and eventually death.

Black leg and Pulpy kidney rarely affect cattle over 2 years of age and tend to be a disease in young, rapidly growing calves as well as breeding females if a calf injury has been sustained. Black leg involves the species c.chauvoei to produce a toxins causing severe muscle damage. Gas eventually builds up in the muscle with a rapid progression to gangrene resulting in a lame animal. The toxin can be absorbed into the bloodstream and fever, weakness and death can occur. Pulpy kidney produces a number of toxins that directly affect the nervous system and blood vessels causing damage. It causes diarrhoea, bellowing, mania, blindness, convulsions and death. Black disease occurs when the liver becomes damaged via liver fluke, multiplying and producing a toxin causing severe liver damage and death. Botulism takes place when the cattle are deficient in protein and phosphorus resulting in decaying material and the chewing of bones as well as toxins being created that cause paralysis leading to breathing failure.

=== Cattle Tick ===
An external parasite known as Rhipicephalus microplus which spread tick fever onto the cattle via three blood-borne organisms Babesia bovis, Anaplasma marginale, Babesia bigemina. Tick fever results in exterior material damage, internal damage, loss of condition, illness and death due to blood loss. Cattle tick is mainly a problem within endemic regions of Australia, with infestation occurring primarily in Western Australia, Queensland and the Northern Territory.

=== Vibriosis ===
A sexually transmitted disease caused by Campylobacter fetus, a venereal bacteria. Bulls are not directly affected and there are no visual signs of the disease however, they can carry the disease for an extended period of time and spread the disease during breeding to females resulting in infertility and abortions occurring mainly around mid-pregnancy. Conception rates can drop as low as 40% and permanent infertility can also occur in some heifers (11%).

=== Pestivirus ===
A complex disease caused by bovine pestivirus, also known as BVDV (bovine viral diarrhoea virus). The disease results in disrupted ovulation and fertilisation around the time of mating resulting in the reduction of pregnancy and conception rates, increased occurrence of calf scours as well as an increase in the occurrence in diarrhoea and respiratory disease. Abortions are likely to occur with the viability of calving and the calves themselves are also decreased. Eye defects and central nervous system problems are also very likely.

=== Leptospirosis ===
A bacterial infection caused by L. hardjo and L. pomona, which form leptosira. Leptospirosis results in infertility, abortions, fever and discolouration, and red water in young calves all of which are severe and often fatal.

Other well known diseases include buffalo fly, neonatal calf mortality, internal parasites, calf scours and bovine ephemeral fever but not all require a vaccination to cure; drenching is what is required for buffalo fly.

The frequency of the major diseases varies depending on climate, time of year, geographical location and management practices. These variations make it complex to develop appropriate vaccination practices and models.

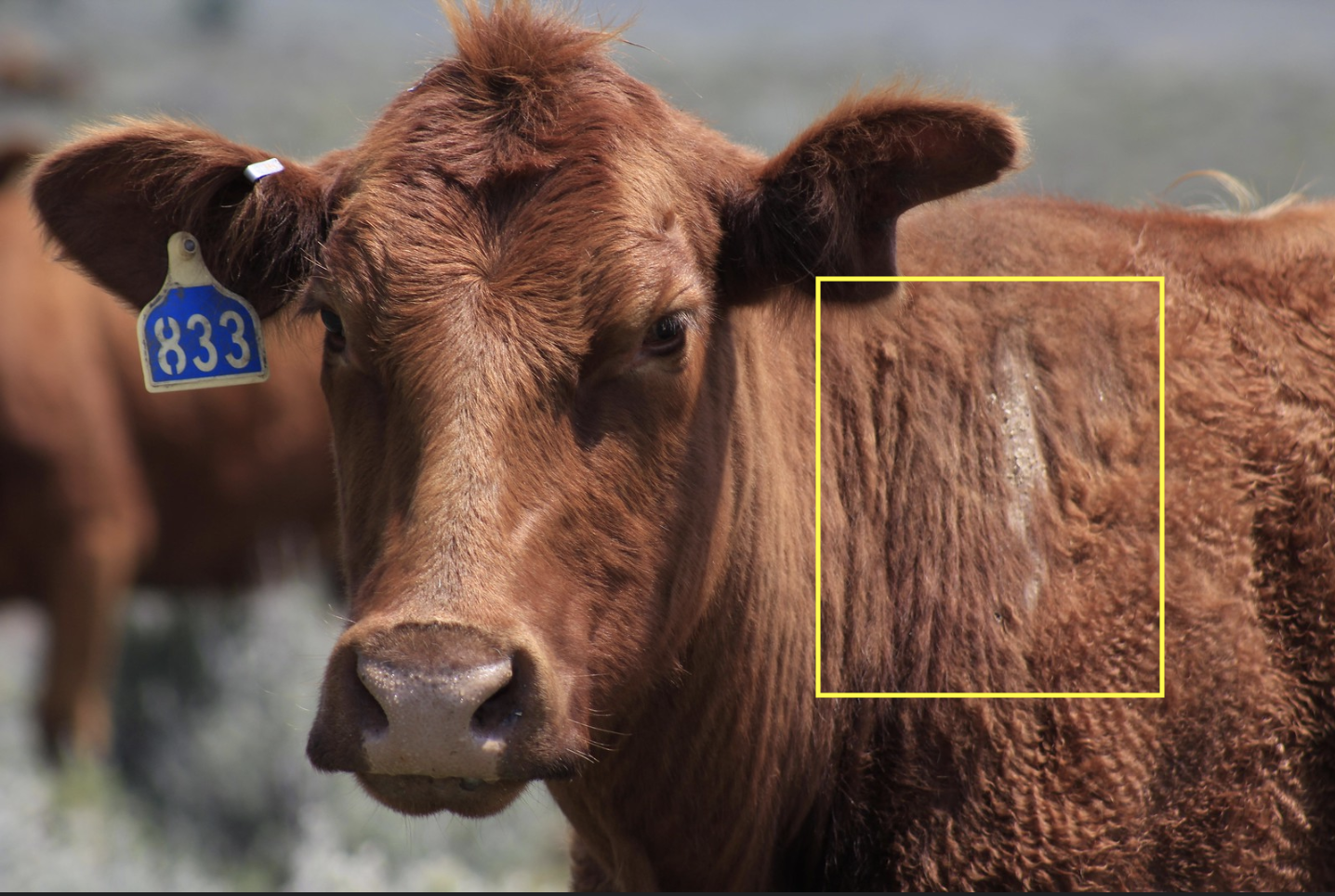
Cattle Vaccination Application Area

== Treatment ==
=== Technique and Procedures ===
As cattle vaccinations are subcutaneous, the vaccine must be injected under the skin and must not penetrate into the muscle. Vaccines must be administered in the area outlined in the source given. An area where the skin is clean should be used for the injection. Some loose skin should be folded and lifted slightly with the free hand, and the vaccination given at the base of the skin where it is 'tented', thus ensuring the needle only penetrates the fold of skin and no further.

Alcohol and other disinfectants can disable a vaccine and therefore should not be used when vaccinating. However, ensure that the needles being used have been sterilised. Usually the needles have already been sterilised if they come in a separate package. It is recommended to use a multi-dose inoculator gun with a clean sharp needle. The needles must be changed regularly.

The vaccine itself needs to be treated appropriately prior to use. Vaccines are sensitive to heat and freezing temperatures and must be kept in a fridge or cooler at an appropriate temperature (read vaccine instructions) from the time of purchase right up until use. Vaccines must also be kept in the dark as they are also sensitive to ultraviolet light. These conditions are necessary for the vaccine to work as effective as possible.

=== Vaccination and Timing ===
Cattle should be vaccinated for the five common clostridial diseases (tetanus, enterotoxaemia, blackleg, malignant oedema and black disease) with a ‘5-in-1’ vaccine. A separate vaccine is available for protection against botulism if required. Leptospirosis vaccine is available as a double vaccine that protects against both L. hardjo and L. pomona bacterium, or is also available in a 7in1 vaccine that combines with the clostridial 5in1 vaccine into one vaccination. The 7in1 vaccine ensures that the spreading of Leptospirosis stops through the prevention of urinary shedding of leptospires while also providing ongoing protection against urinary tract colonisation of leptospira and foetal and placental infection.

For both the 5in1 and 7in1 vaccines, calves should be vaccinated from 6 weeks of age as this is the primary dose of vaccine for a calf as it allows them to stimulate their own antibody production. A 'booster' vaccine should also be given at 12 weeks of age to continue this development. Heifers, steers and cows should receive an annual dose to keep boosting their protective immunity, resulting in lifelong immunity against most clostridial and leptospirosis diseases.

Botulism vaccines follow the same program as the 5in1 and 7in1 vaccines however it takes 4 to 5 weeks to develop immunity and usually the first affected animals tend to die within the first 12 to 24 hours after they develop signs and symptoms. Longer duration vaccines tend to be used in endemic regions of Australia where the disease is regularly encountered whereas shorter duration vaccines are used where the occurrence of botulism is sporadic. The vaccine prevents the generation of toxins created by botulism which cause paralysis and protein and phosphorus deficiency causing respiratory failure, the chewing of bones and material decay.

Cattle tick, while primarily treated with drenching can also be treated via an injectable vaccine. This reduces the occurrence of any internal damages caused by cattle tick and the three blood borne organisms it produces, protecting the liver, stomach and small intestines. Treatment can be given at any time but ideally during weaning, 3 to 9 months of age. An annual booster should not be required unless signs and symptoms reappear after some time in heavily affected areas in Australia, i.e. endemic regions.

For Vibrosis, bulls should receive two doses of the vaccine Vibrovax when being introduced, 4 weeks apart. An annual booster is also required for lifelong immunity. Heifers greater than 18 months of age also require a vaccination of Vibrovax. Annual boosters are recommended to continue the lifelong immunity to ensure the eradication of the disease from the animal. Vibrosis vaccines ensures the reduction in late calves and allows pregnancy rates and calving percentages to stay at their natural levels.

Pestivirus vaccine should be administered to heifers and previously unvaccinated cows. The vaccine prevents nasal shedding of the disease to protect the reproductive potential of heifers and cows. The primary vaccine should be given 6 to 8 weeks before joining a current herd and a second reinforcing booster dose given 2 to 4 weeks before joining the herd. An annual booster should also be administered. Bulls should be vaccinated at the same time as cows to safeguard the cows and heifers during mating time.

Instructions must be read and expiration dates checked to give the correct dosage and technique of the vaccine. Before beginning a vaccination program, a veterinarian, beef adviser or stock inspector should be contacted for up-to-date advice.

== Economic impact ==
The beef cattle industry is Australia's largest geographically spread livestock industry as well as the largest livestock industry by value. As a result of this, large costs are incurred for treatment, production losses and prevention. Cattle are very susceptible to diseases as they are a bovine livestock, the prevalence and frequency of these diseases (mentioned above) depend on climate, time of year, geographical location and management practices. Thus, it is extremely difficult and complex to derive and estimate the national costs associated with these diseases and animal health issues. In 2015 Meat and Livestock Australia (MLA) created a report to fill the gap in current information on disease economical impacts that estimated the costs associated with different diseases within Australia. These costs include treatment, prevention and production loss.

Cattle Tick is the largest costing disease in the beef industry with an estimated economical impact of an estimated $161 million AUD annually. An estimated $156 million AUD of that was in the endemic states alone. The procedures to prevent and treat this disease are the main costs involved with Cattle Tick. Pesitvirus (BVDV) was identified as the second largest costing disease with an estimated $114 million AUD annually spent on the treatment, prevention and production loss. Production loss and prevention efforts are the largest costs associated with Pestivirus (BVDV). Bovine ephemeral fever, vibriosis, Closterium diseases, neonatal calf mortality, calf scours and internal parasites account for a combined estimated $333.4 million AUD in costs annually. These costs are spread across the nation and are not distributed equally due to geographical measures and climate.

Vaccinations have helped bring this number down to what it could potentially be without effective treatment and prevention techniques like vaccinations. Disease prevention and treatment through the administration of vaccinations stops the spread of disease in cattle and reduces the potential economical as well as biological impact that diseases threaten. Extensive vaccination management programs maximise the yield and overall health of cattle resulting in a healthier beef industry within Australia. The beef industry in Australia plays a critical role in the national economy. Australia is the world's third largest exporter of beef, exporting to around 77 countries globally and is a very important part of the Australian economy. The export beef industry in Australia generates a gross value of approximately $8 billion AUD, with a total of $11.4 billion in total national production.
