= CSL Limited =

Australian biotechnology company

- Type: Public
- Traded as: ASX: CSL; S&P/ASX 200 component
- Industry: Biotechnology
- Founded: 1916 (Federal government department), 1994 (privatised)
- Headquarters: Parkville, Melbourne, Victoria, Australia (Global),
- Products: blood plasma, vaccines, antivenom, other laboratory and medical products
- Revenue: US$14.8 billion (2024)
- Net income: ▲US$2.91 billion (2024)
- Number of employees: 32,000 (2024)
- Divisions: CSL Behring; CSL Plasma; CSL Seqirus; CSL Vifor
- Website: www.csl.com

CSL Limited is an Australian multinational specialty biotechnology company that researches, develops, manufactures, and markets products to treat and prevent serious human medical conditions. CSL's product areas include blood plasma derivatives, vaccines, antivenom, and cell culture reagents used in various medical and genetic research and manufacturing applications. The company was established in 1916 as Commonwealth Serum Laboratories and was wholly owned by the Australian federal government until its privatisation in 1994.

== History ==
=== Origin and Penfold directorship ===
CSL was founded in 1916 as Commonwealth Serum Laboratories, an Australian government body focused on vaccine manufacture. Under the first director, William Penfold, CSL commenced operation in the vacant Walter and Eliza Hall Institute building at the Royal Melbourne Hospital in 1918 before moving to its purpose-built Parkville premises in the following year.

=== Morgan directorship ===
After ongoing disputes with the Department of Health and its director-general John Cumpston, Penfold resigned in 1927 and was replaced by Frederic Morgan. Soon after Morgan's appointment, CSL was drawn into a serious public health disaster when a batch of its diphtheria toxin-antitoxin was implicated in the deaths of twelve children in what became known as the Bundaberg tragedy of 1928. Although CSL's manufacturing processes were absolved, its labelling procedures were seen to be in error, leading to an enduring focus on the highest standards across the facility's production.

=== Antivenene research and production ===
In 1928, CSL also became involved in antivenene (antivenom) manufacture in conjunction with the snake venom research undertaken by Charles Kellaway at the Hall Institute. This led to the successful clinical testing of antivenene against tiger snake Notechis scutatus bite in 1930 and its commercial release in 1931.

In 1934, the research on snake venoms was transferred from the Hall Institute to CSL under the direction of former snake showman and herpetologist Tom "Pambo" Eades. This represented the initiation of research at the laboratories – an outcome its directors had been seeking for over a decade. The relationship with the Hall Institute continued until World War II, particularly via joint projects on viral diseases including polio and influenza coordinated by Frank Macfarlane Burnet and Esmond "Bill" Keogh. Keogh played an important role in the establishment of penicillin production at CSL in 1944 – a critical wartime achievement.

=== Plasma fractionation and Wiener directorship ===
In 1952, operation commenced plasma fractionation. Thereafter the range of antivenoms increased, including those against other snake species such as death adder (Acanthophis antarcticus) and the taipan (Oxyuranus scutellatus), plus spiders including the redback (Latrodectus hasselti) and – after much difficulty – the Sydney funnel-web (Atrax robustus). Much of this work, including the introduction in 1962 of a polyvalent antivenom against all of the major terrestrial Australian snakes, occurred under the direction of Saul Wiener, while from 1966 until the mid-1990s, venom research was coordinated by the eccentric but dedicated Struan Sutherland, who in 1979 released new guidelines for snakebite first aid, and a new test for snakebites that would identify which snake had envenomated the victim.

Other major achievements of CSL include:

- early production of insulin for treatment of Australian diabetics (1923)
- development of a tetanus vaccine (1938)
- development of a combined vaccine for diphtheria, tetanus and whooping cough (1953)
- rapid adoption and production of a polio vaccine (1956)
- development of a multi-purpose animal vaccine covering pulpy kidney (enterotoxemia), tetanus, black disease, malignant oedema and blackleg (1961)
- production of Rhesus (D) immunoglobulin to prevent haemolytic disease in newborns due to Rh factor incompatibility (1966–67)
- pioneering heat treatment to protect blood and plasma products from infection with HIV (1983)
- collaboration on development of the world's first human papillomavirus vaccine, Gardasil, building on the pioneering work by Professor Ian Frazer (1994–2005).

=== Privatisation ===
In 1994, the Commonwealth facility was privatised by the Keating government as CSL Ltd. and was publicly listed and traded on the Australian Securities Exchange. The company completed an initial public offering in June 1994 at A$2.30 per share (76.7c adjusted for split). CSL stock is part of the S&P/ASX 20 Index.

=== Acquisition of ZLB Bioplasma AG and Aventis Behring ===
In 2000, CSL doubled its size through the purchase of a Swiss plasma company, the Bern-based ZLB Bioplasma AG. In 2004, during a period of plasma oversupply, the company expanded again with the purchase of the German medical company Aventis Behring. The company was the second Australian public company to have reached a share price of over $100 per share.

=== Acquisition and merging of Novartis' vaccine business ===
In October 2014, Novartis announced its intention to sell its influenza vaccine business, including its development pipeline, to CSL for $275 million. CSL merged it into its BioCSL operation.

In November 2015, BioCSL rebranded the combined business with Novartis Influenza Vaccines as Seqirus [Sek-eer-us], creating the world's second-largest influenza vaccine company.

In August 2017, the business announced it would acquire Calimmune and its stem cell therapy platform.

Completed in 2018, Seqirus's plant in Holly Spring, NC was funded with $59 million from the U.S. government.

in June 2020, CSL announced it would exercise its right to acquire Vitaeris.

In December 2021, the business announced it would acquire Swiss drugmaker, Vifor Pharma AG, for $11.7 billion.

In August 2022, CSL rebranded all of its divisions to start with the CSL name. Therefore, the divisions became CSL Behring, CSL Plasma, CSL Seqirus, and CSL Vifor.

=== Acquisition history ===
CSL Limited acquisitions
- CSL Limited (Founded 1916 as Commonwealth Serum Laboratories)
  - ZLB Behring
    - ZLB Bioplasma AG (Acq 2000)
    - Aventis Behring (Acq 2004)
    - Vifor Pharma (Acq 2021)
  - Seqirus (Merged 2014)
    - BioCSL
    - Novartis Influenza Vaccines div.
  - Calimmune (Acq 2017)
  - Vitaeris (Acq 2020)

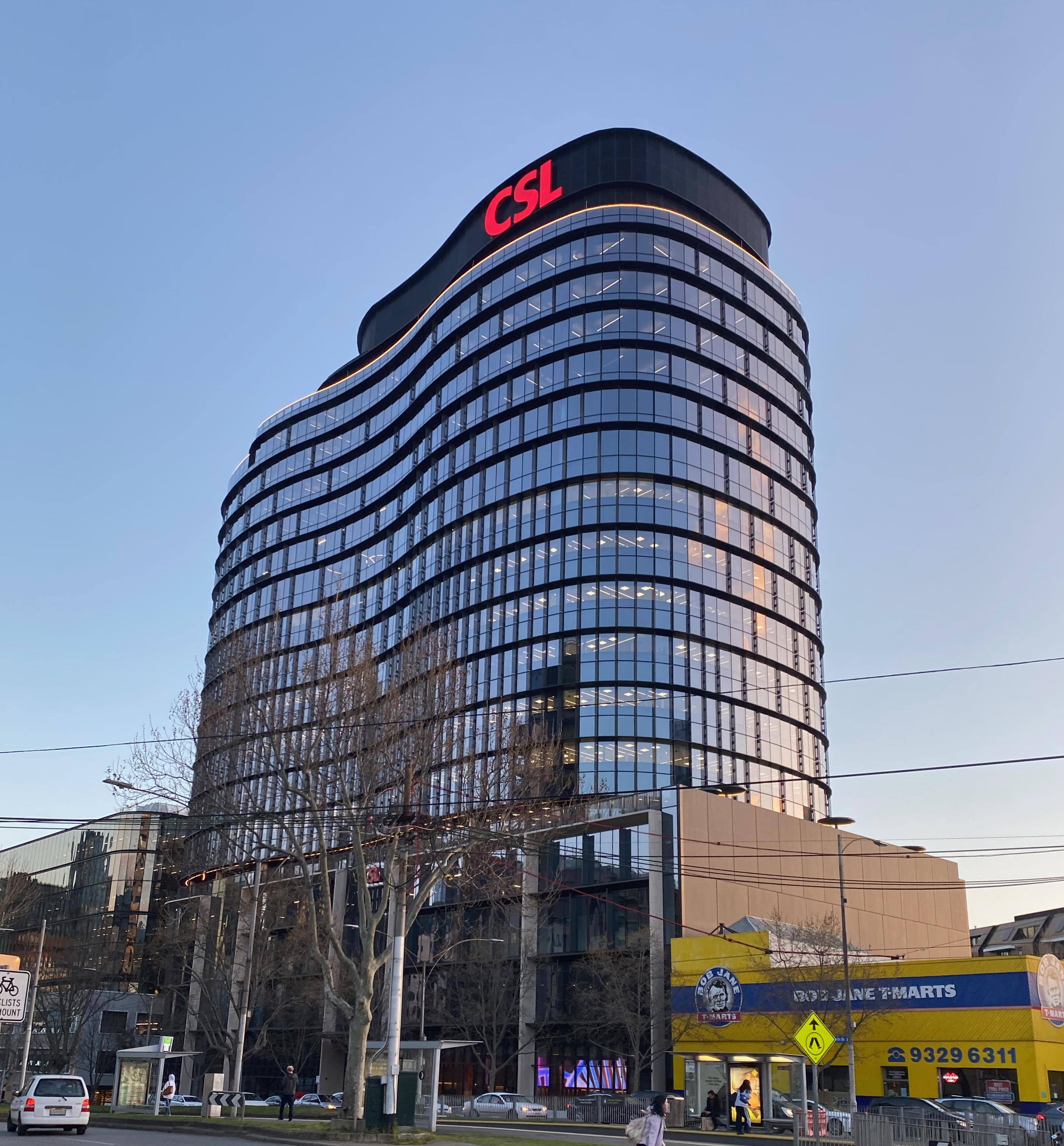
CSL's global headquarters building in Parkville, Victoria

== Locations ==
The company's headquarters remain in Parkville, Victoria, an inner suburb of Melbourne, and has offices and laboratory space in Sydney.

CSL Behring is headquartered in King of Prussia, USA and it has manufacturing operations and R&D laboratories in Broadmeadows, Victoria, the Swiss city of Bern, in Marburg in Germany, and Kankakee, USA.

Seqirus has its headquarters in Maidenhead and has production facilities in Holly Springs, US, Liverpool, UK, and Parkville, Victoria

== Vaccines ==
=== A/H1N1 2009 pandemic ===
CSL's vaccine for swine flu, the world's first, was approved in September 2009 for use by people over age 10. The federal government ordered 21 million doses of vaccine for Australians. CSL also provided vaccines for customers in Singapore and the US.

On 28 September 2010, the Australian Therapeutic Goods Administration (TGA) conducted an analysis of febrile convulsions following immunisation in children following monovalent pandemic H1N1 vaccine (Panvax/Panvax Junior, CSL).

A paper published in the Medical Journal of Australia provides a possible reason for CSL's 2010 flu vaccine causing febrile convulsions in children. The authors hypothesise that suboptimal use of the detergent called deoxycholate – used in the manufacturing process by CSL (one of the few vaccine manufacturers that use it) – to split the flu virus from its membrane may be at fault.

=== COVID-19 pandemic ===
On 7 September 2020, CSL signed agreements with the Australian government to supply the University of Queensland vaccine (V451) and to manufacture (with AstraZeneca) the Oxford University vaccine (AZD1222), which would yield nearly 85 million doses for Australians. The agreement was contingent on the future success of clinical trials of these vaccines. Most of the manufacture would occur in Melbourne, Australia.

On 11 December 2020, after a high percentage of the University of Queensland vaccine trial participants returned "false positive" results for HIV, it was decided that vaccine development will not proceed to Phase 2/3 trials.

On 23 March 2021, the Therapeutic Goods Administration provisionally approved the first batches, numbering 832,000 doses, of the Oxford–AstraZeneca COVID-19 vaccine manufactured by CSL in its plant in Broadmeadows, Victoria. The Australian Government has contracted CSL to produce 50 million doses of the vaccine.

== Divisions ==
CSL Limited's products can be separated by company division. Some of the key products produced by each division, have included:

=== Seqirus (bioCSL) ===
Vaccines:

- Afluria (influenza vaccine) -- Argentina, Peru, South Africa, Spain, US
  - Enzira—in various different markets
  - Fluvax—in various different markets
  - Nilgrip—in various different markets
- Afluria Quadrivalent (influenza vaccine) -- Australia, Canada, New Zealand, US
  - Afluria Quad—in various different markets
  - Afluria Tetra—in various different markets
- Agrippal (influenza vaccine) -- Argentina, Austria, Brazil, Canada, Chile, Colombia, Germany, Italy, Mexico, Spain, Thailand
  - Agriflu—in various different markets
  - Begripal—in various different markets
  - Chiroflu—in various different markets
  - Fluazur—in various different markets
  - Sandovac—in various different markets
- Audenz (influenza A (H5N1) vaccine) -- US
- Fluad (influenza vaccine) -- Argentina, Austria, Australia, Brazil, Canada, Denmark, Germany, Italy, Spain, Switzerland, UK, US
  - Chiromas—Spain
- Fluad Pediatric (influenza vaccine) -- Canada
- Flucelvax Quadrivalent (influenza vaccine) -- Germany, Italy, Spain, UK, US
- Q-VAX (Coxiella burnetii vaccine) -- Australia
- Rapivab (peramivir) -- Australia, US

Antivenoms: (Australia)

- Black snake
- Box jellyfish
- Brown snake
- Death adder
- Funnel web spider
- Polyvalent snake antivenom
- Redback spider
- Sea snake
- Stonefish
- Taipan
- Tiger snake
- Snake Venom Detection Kit

=== CSL Behring (Australia) ===
- Albumex (serum albumin)
- Biostate (Factor VIII)
- Carimune, which is immunoglobulin for intravenous administration (IGIV)
- CMV Immunoglobulin-VF (cytomegalovirus immunoglobulin)
- Helixate, which is recombinant Antihemophilic Factor, a blood-clotting factor for the treatment of haemophilia
- Hepatitis B immunoglobulin
- human immunoglobulin – Intragam P, Normal, Rh(D) Immunoglobulin-VF, Sandoglobulin,
- MonoFIX-VF (Factor IX)
- Prothrombinex-HT (prothrombin complex)
- Rhophylac (Rh(D) immunoglobulin G)
- Tetanus Immunoglobulin-VF
- Thrombotrol-VF (antithrombin III)
- Vivaglobin, sub-cutaneous human immune globulin indicated for the treatment of primary immunodeficiency. This product gained FDA approval in January 2006.
- Von Willebrand factor
- Zoster Immunoglobulin-VF (varicella zoster immunoglobulin)

=== CSL Behring ===
Immunology:

- Beriglobin P, human hepatitis A immunoglobulin, liquid 16% solution for intramuscular injection
- Berirab P, human rabies immunoglobulin, liquid 16% solution for intramuscular injection
- Carimune NF, Sandoglobulin, Sanglopor human normal immunoglobulin, freeze-dried formulations for intravenous administration
- Cytogam, human cytomegalovirus immunoglobulin. Liquid immunoglobulin containing a standardized amount of antibody to cytomegalovirus.
- Hepatitis B Immunoglobulin P Behring, human hepatitis B immunoglobulin, liquid 16% solution for intramuscular injection
- Hizentra, Human normal immunoglobulin. Liquid 20% immunoglobulin solution, ready-to-use for subcutaneous administration
- Privigen, human polyvalent immunoglobulin, liquid 10% solution for intravenous injection
- Rhesogamma P, human anti-D immunoglobulin. Prefilled syringes of highly purified anti-Rhesus factor D IgG for intravenous administration and intramuscular injection.
- Rhophylac human anti-D immunoglobulin. Prefilled syringes of highly purified anti-Rhesus factor D IgG for intravenous administration and intramuscular injection.
- Sandoglobulin NF Liquid, Redimune, Redimune NF Liquid, human normal immunoglobulin, liquid 12% solution for intravenous administration
- Tetagam P, human tetanus immunoglobulin, liquid 16% solution for intramuscular injection
- Varicellon P, human varicella immunoglobulin, liquid 16% solution for intramuscular injection
- Vivaglobin, human normal immunoglobulin, liquid 16% solution for subcutaneous administration

Coagulation/Bleeding Disorders:

- Beriate, freeze-dried human coagulation factor VIII concentrate
- Berinin P, freeze-dried human coagulation factor IX concentrate
- Factor X P Behring, a freeze-dried human coagulation factor IX and factor X concentrate
- Fibrogammin P, Cluvot and Corifact, freeze-dried human coagulation factor XIII concentrate
- Helixate FS and Helixate NexGen, freeze-dried recombinant coagulation factor VIII
- Humate-P and Haemate P, freeze-dried human coagulation factor VIII: C and von Willebrand factor concentrate
- Monoclate P, a freeze-dried monoclonal antibody purified human coagulation factor VIII concentrate
- Mononine, a freeze-dried human coagulation factor IX that has been purified using monoclonal antibodies
- Stimate, a synthetic desmopressin acetate nasal spray
- Octostim, a synthetic desmopressin acetate nasal spray

Pulmonary:

- Zemaira, Respreeza freeze-dried Human Alpha_{1}-proteinase inhibitor (A_{1}-PI)

Critical Care:

- AlbuRx, Alburex, Albumeon, Human Albumin Behring, Albuminar 25, human albumin solution (5%, 20% or 25% human albumin solutions)
- Berinert P, freeze-dried human C_{1}-esterase inhibitor (C1-INH) concentrate
- Beriplex P/N, freeze-dried human prothrombin complex concentrate
- Haemocomplettan P, RiaSTAP, freeze-dried human fibrinogen (factor I) concentrate
- Kybernin P, freeze-dried human antithrombin III concentrate
- Streptase, freeze-dried streptokinase

Wound Healing:

- Beriplast P Combi-Set, fibrin sealant kit, freeze-dried fibrin sealant for topical application
- Fibrogammin P, freeze-dried human coagulation factor XIII concentrate
- TachoComb, fibrin sealant fleece-type, fleece-type collagen preparations coated with fibrin glue components

Product availability varies from country to country, depending on registration status.

== Honours ==
In 2011, the company received the Minister's Award for Outstanding Equal Employment Opportunities Initiative for their Thinking Kids Children's Centre.

== See also ==
- Australian Red Cross Blood Service
- CSL collection

== Sources ==
- AH Brogan, Committed to Saving Lives: a History of the Commonwealth Serum Laboratories (Melbourne: Hyland House, 1990).
- Dando McCredie, The Fight Against Disease and CSL's Seventy Year Contribution (Richmond: Dando McCredie, c.1986).
- FG Morgan, 'The Commonwealth Serum Laboratories and their work', Collected Proceedings of the Society of Chemical Industry of Victoria, XXXV (1935), 1015–31.
- WJ Penfold, 'The Commonwealth Serum Laboratories', Medical Journal of Australia, 1 (14 April 1923), 396–400.
- Struan K Sutherland, A Venomous Life: the Autobiography of Professor Struan Sutherland (Melbourne: Hyland House, 1998).
