= WaHu Student Apartments =

Apartment building in Minneapolis, Minnesota

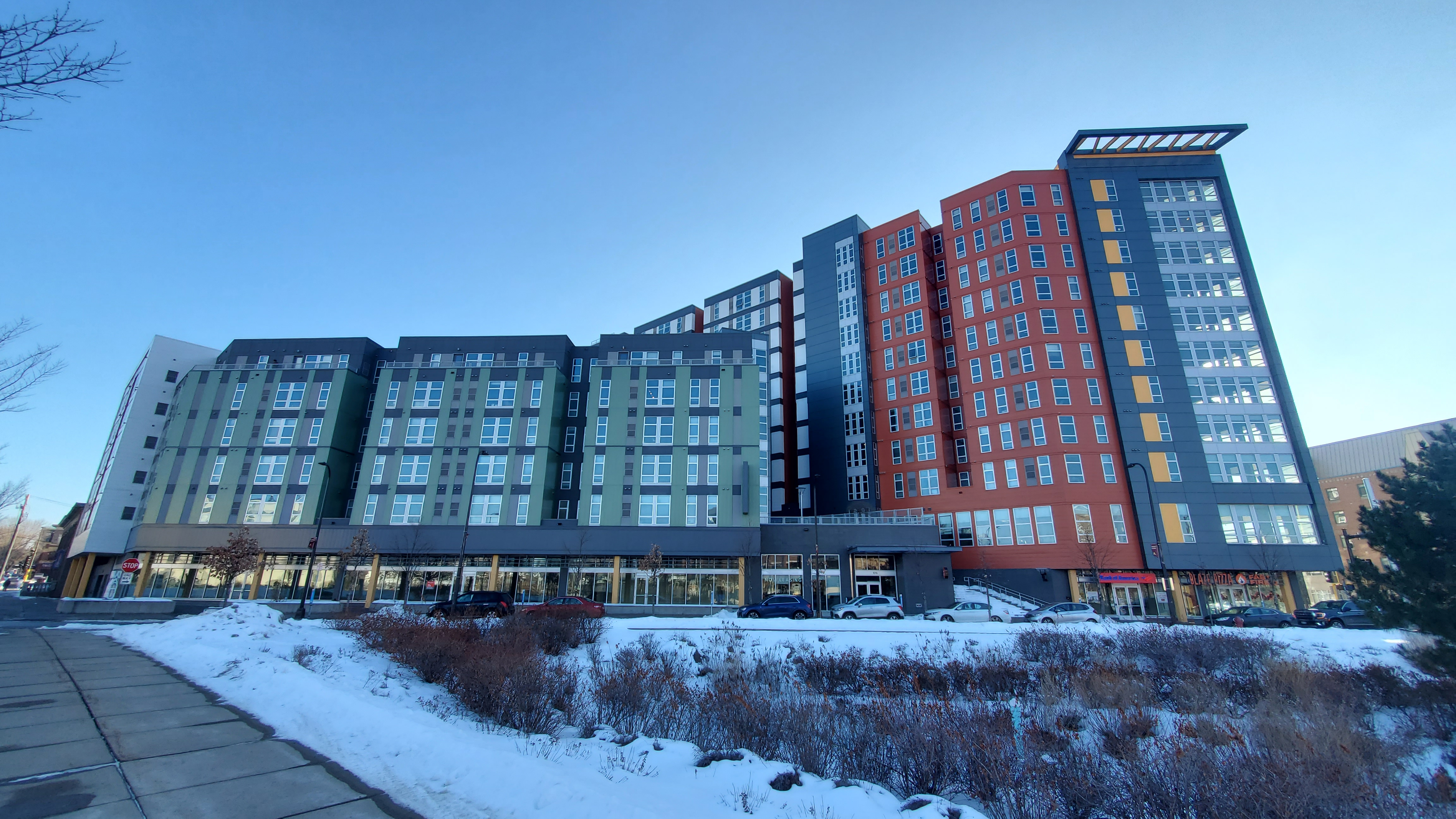
- The building in 2023
- Interactive map of the WaHu Student Apartments area
- Alternative names: WaHu; Wahu

General information
- Type: Residential; mixed-use
- Architectural style: Modern
- Location: Minneapolis, Minnesota, 1016 Washington Avenue Southeast
- Coordinates: 44°58′23″N 93°13′21″W
- Construction started: December 2013
- Completed: August 2015
- Cost: $90 million (USD)
- Client: CPM Development
- Landlord: B.HOM Student Living LLC

Height
- Height: 132 ft (40 m)

Technical details
- Floor count: 11
- Floor area: 550,000 sq ft (51,000 m^{2})

Design and construction
- Architecture firm: BKV Group
- Developer: North Bay Companies; Reuter Walton Development

WaHu Student Apartments (also known simply as WaHu or Wahu) is a luxury residential apartment building located in Minneapolis, Minnesota. It was first announced in 2012 with intent to cater to the campus population of the nearby University of Minnesota. The complex comprises 327 residential units within three apartment towers. It also contains designated retail space, currently leased by tenants such as Bank of America, and several local restaurants.

Its name is a combination of the two roads at its adjacent intersection, Huron Boulevard Southeast and Washington Avenue Southeast. WaHu Student Apartments is located in the Stadium Village neighborhood of Minneapolis, built atop the site of a former blood plasma clinic that contributed to several construction delays for the complex. Neighboring structures to the apartment complex include TCF Bank Stadium and the Stadium Village light rail station. Construction of WaHu Student Apartments was completed in August 2015, in time for the start of the academic year.

== Construction and completion ==
WaHu Student Apartments was designed by the Minneapolis-based architectural firm BKV Group. The project was first discussed in 2012, along with plans to relocate current businesses on the site, including a blood plasma donation center called CSL. Construction of WaHu Student Apartments was estimated to reach completion in 2014 in time for the start of the academic year, although this was later pushed back to 2015 due to CSL's decision to complete their original leasing agreement, which ended in August 2014. The plasma clinic initially explored relocating options as early as 2012, but the city of Minneapolis disapproved of a plan to rezone a lot across the street from its current location to allow for medical research. WaHu Student Apartment's client was local apartment developer CPM Development, the company behind 15 other housing projects in Minneapolis. Daniel Oberpriller, a co-founder of CPM Development, formally announced the project in mid-2013 and labeled it as a luxury student housing project.

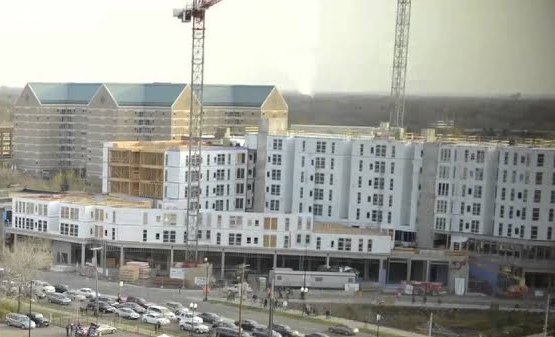
WaHu under construction in 2014

The CSL Plasma center prevented construction of the site from beginning due to their inability to lock down a new, suitable location. On September 20, 2013, Finance & Commerce magazine confirmed that the company was able to lease a suitably-zoned space for medical research, allowing work on WaHu Student Apartments to start, beginning in December 2013. Construction on the project was completed in August 2015. Its developers consisted of locally-based North Bay Companies and Reuter Walton Development. B.HOM Student Living LLC manages the residential units of WaHu Student Apartments, while Colliers International handles the retail tenants.

== Design and location ==
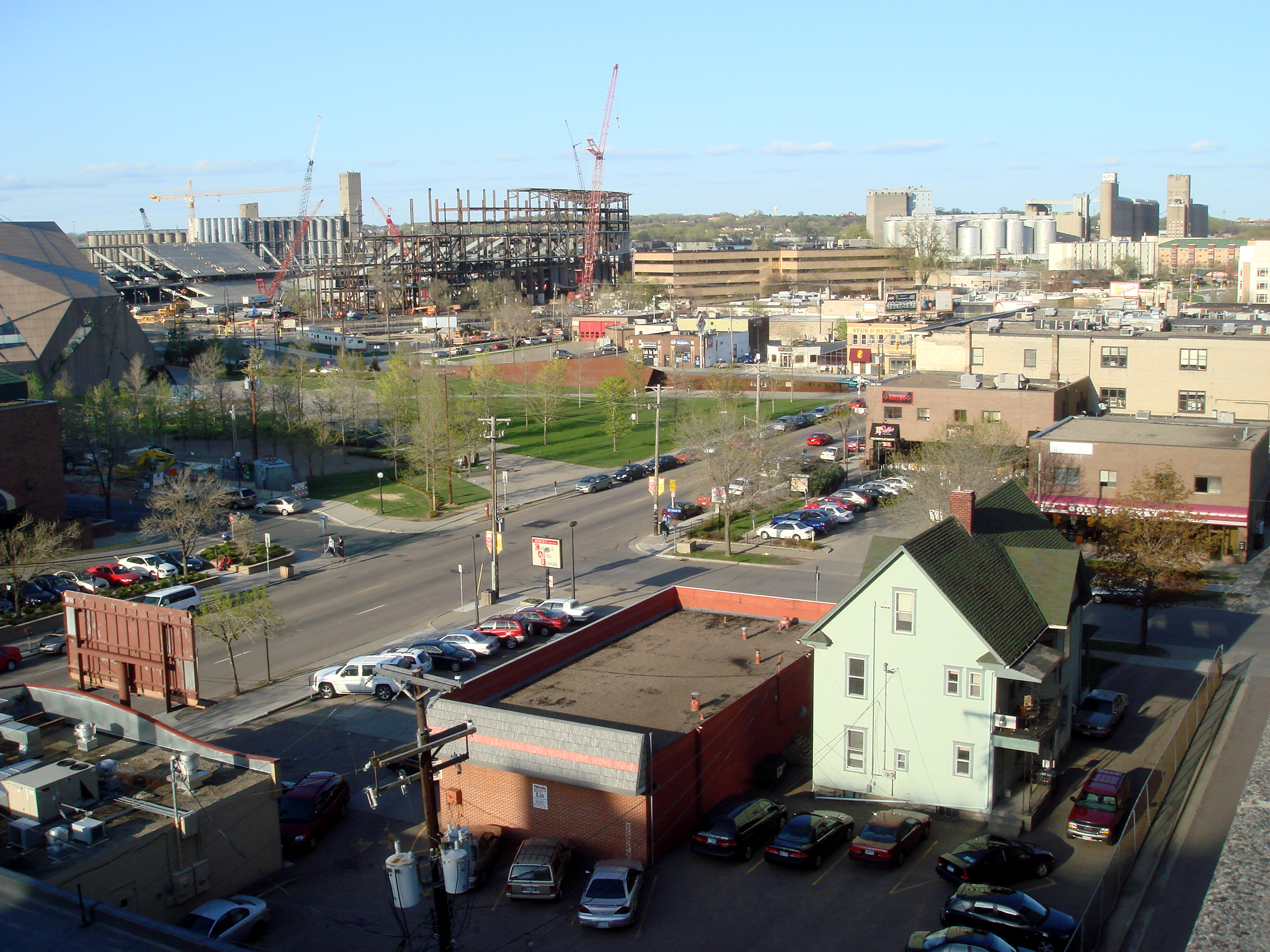
WaHu Student Apartments is located within Minneapolis's Stadium Village neighborhood.

WaHu Student Apartments consists of eleven stories with a total of 327 residential units. With an angular design, it contains two 6-story residential towers and one 11-story tower. The apartment units range from studio efficiencies to four bedroom and four bathroom units. The peak height of the tallest tower is 132 ft (40 m), comparable to neighboring apartment buildings in Stadium Village. The first floor of the apartment complex contains 24,000 sq ft (2,200 m^{2}) of leasable retail space, designated for restaurants, bars, and shops. Tenants include Bank of America, Sip of Silk Café, and the MuMu bubble teahouse, formerly called Bambu. Two other available retail suites sit vacant.

The complex's design contains elements of modern architecture, with "materials such as glass, metal panels, metal siding, and cement board panels". The first floor storefronts contain large quantities of glass, with certain sections of windows repeating upwards to the eleventh floor.

WaHu Student Apartments is located at the intersection of Huron Boulevard Southeast and Washington Avenue Southeast, adjacent to other student housing projects like Stadium View Apartments, Solhaus, and Solhaus Tower. Set within the Stadium Village neighborhood of Minneapolis, it was constructed on the site of the former plasma donation center and an Arby's restaurant. WaHu Student Apartments is adjacent to the University of Minnesota's TCF Bank Stadium and across the street from the Stadium Village station for the Metro Green Line light rail line. According to officials from the city of Minneapolis, the project was compliant with the university's "master plan" for student housing, which calls for residential projects with similar unit densities and building heights.
