= Sunderland Economic Masterplan =

Front page of Sunderland's Economic Masterplan

The City of Sunderland is a large city on the north east coast of England. The city spans the River Wear, which winds its way to the Port of Sunderland through farmland, parks, and urban communities.

The purpose of the Sunderland Economic Masterplan is threefold:

- To help set the direction for the city's economy over the next 15 years starting in October 2010
- To establish how Sunderland will earn its living over that period and what that will look like on the ground
- To set out the actions private, public, and voluntary sector partners across the city need to take to ensure that Sunderland has a prosperous and sustainable future.

The recent UK recession has highlighted the need to create economic opportunities for the city. The reduction in public spending provides further impetus for a shift towards new forms of wealth generation.

The Economic Masterplan was funded by Sunderland City Council with support from One NorthEast and delivered by a consortium of consultants led by GENECON LLP and overseen by a Steering Group. Consultation during its development has involved Councilors, citizens businesses, government agencies, and local partner organizations .

== Global trends ==
Four global trends affect the future of Sunderland.

- Globalisation – accelerating the decline in traditional industries, but also fueling the city's recovery. Sunderland must build on local strengths and assets, including skilled labour and business expertise.
- Climate change and energy generation creating costs in limiting the impact of climate change but also opportunities in developing new business and employment.
- Technological change – the city must continually refresh and update its ICT infrastructure and the skills of its population to adapt to technological demands.
- People and skills – there is a growing premium on talent and skills and an ageing population brings new requirements for healthcare, social care and transport.

== History and development ==
Sunderland is known for its coal mining and shipbuilding heritage, but in recent decades these industries have disappeared. Between 1975 and 1989 the city lost a quarter of its jobs. Since then Sunderland has replaced and exceeded the number of jobs lost, mainly through international business investment.

However, Sunderland suffers from serious deprivation as well as average wages that are lower than the rest of the UK. Because of its history, the city displays a development pattern which does not focus on a single centre. With the A19 and A1 becoming the main arterial connections, more recent development has been focused away from the urban centres. The resultant pattern of development is now dispersed. Sunderland needs to focus on its core as an important driver of the economy.

== Economy ==
Port of Sunderland

The Sunderland city centre has suffered from new employment developing almost exclusively on out-of-town sites and from depressed economic activity. Only 16.6% of the district's employment is located in the city centre compared with 33% in Newcastle upon Tyne, which means less spending power ‘on the doorstep’. Vibrant city centres largely depend upon the public using shops, restaurants and other facilities. Consequently, it has fewer shops and leisure facilities than it should.

There is an opportunity to use key development areas such as Stadium Village, the former Vaux site, Farringdon Row and the Port to shift the orientation of the centre towards the sea and river. Several assets should be exploited to benefit the city centre:

- The former Vaux site and Farringdon Row to provide a central business district
- The two University campuses becoming an integral part of the city centre
- The Minster area as a new Minster Quarter.

A linked chain of attractions could be developed on the north side of the river running from Stadium Village to Roker seafront. Making more of the riverside in this way would radically enhance visitor appeal.

Meanwhile, the centre would be made more attractive and easier to navigate with upgraded public areas and gateways, including the railway station. Better housing will help to enhance the centre as a whole and bring in new spending power.

Sunderland has assets outside the city centre that could help to expand the local economy:

- The university and college for business development and skills improvement.
- The port.
- Sunderland's digital connectivity.
- Parks and green spaces, river and seafront.
- The range of business parks and companies already located there.
- Sunderland's track record at attracting international investment.
- Nissan for its sheer scale and also its intention to produce electric vehicles.

The current financial climate poses particular difficulties for commercial developments in the city centre. Consequently, the city will need to identify new sources of funding, build-to-let residential models and focus on pre-lets to enhance investor confidence.

Despite the creation of new jobs in the city in recent decades, Sunderland still suffers from high unemployment and a low skill base. If Sunderland matched the national picture then approximately 12,000 extra people would be at work. Sunderland has a high percentage of people qualified to National Vocational Qualification (NVQ) level 1 and 2 and fewer qualified to NVQ level 3 and 4 – with the latter more likely to be earning higher wages. Many of the better-paid jobs that do exist in Sunderland are taken by people who commute in from the surrounding areas.

Sunderland's labour force supplies local demand in the main. Eighty percent of those who work in the city also live in Sunderland. The private car (either as a driver or passenger) is by far the dominant transport choice for both residents and employees.

Sunderland's population decline appears to have halted but the city is still losing people in the 15-29 age group. Insufficient economic opportunities combined with weak housing, shopping and cultural attractions, are responsible for young people leaving Sunderland to find higher-skilled and higher-paid employment and career opportunities elsewhere.

Sunderland has a high carbon footprint, higher than that of Newcastle. Although industry accounts for a significant portion of this, it is domestic carbon output that drives the figure up. Partners in the city need to consider how residents and businesses can be helped to reduce their carbon footprint.

Moving to a low- and zero-carbon regional economy could attract organisations serving the technical needs of such an economy. Sunderland should focus on those low-carbon industries where it enjoys a competitive advantage and exploit their carbon-reducing potential as well as their economic benefits.

== Key challenges ==
The growth of employment primarily in out-of-town locations has left the city centre underpowered as an economic driver. The scarcity of office jobs has hindered the development of better shopping and leisure facilities, leaving the centre insufficiently attractive to residents and businesses alike. This has made it difficult to improve the quality of the city centre. As a consequence, the city centre does not serve its purpose economically or socially.

Sunderland's economy remains too reliant on a narrow range of industries. The city has successfully moved from ships and coal to cars and contact centres, but does not have the variety of industries and career opportunities, nor the volume of well-paid jobs necessary to retain more of the younger population and to ensure a resilient economy.

In part, this narrow industrial base persists because Sunderland has been more successful in attracting international companies than in helping indigenous businesses to grow, as demonstrated by the scarcity of business start-ups in the city.

Sunderland is a city with a university, but does not yet possess the characteristics and qualities of a ‘university city’. Its two campuses are adjacent to the city centre but have not been properly integrated with it. The University of Sunderland has the potential to become an economic and culture-changing asset, with a strong civic role aligned with supporting the economic transformation of the city centre and of the city as a whole.

The relatively low skills and aspirations of the population mean that in general residents earn less than incoming commuters. Relatively few are highly qualified and an unacceptably large proportion of people of working age are not in work and therefore are not benefiting from the growing economy. The choice of housing in Sunderland has been limited in the past because of the large number of people in similar occupations on similar incomes. Housing choice has not kept pace with rising aspirations and incomes. As a consequence, the city has been losing younger people and young families.

== Economic opportunities ==
Wind farm

=== Software ===
Sunderland has assets that make it an attractive location for these types of businesses. High-quality sites and premises, excellent telecommunications connectivity, the School of Technology and Computing at Sunderland University and the support of a wide range of stakeholders. The sector also links closely to the low-carbon agenda, offering opportunities to use software to reduce carbon-dioxide emissions across a range of industries.

=== Offshore Energy Generation ===
There is immense potential for offshore wind farms. Government policy dictates that power generation from offshore wind sources is a necessity both for electricity supply and to help meet stringent EC and worldwide targets agreed upon for reducing greenhouse gas emissions. The Port of Sunderland's ability to play an important role has been underestimated in the past but is now more widely appreciated. Sunderland is well placed to provide docking facilities for survey boats, for the operation and maintenance of offshore wind farms, component manufacturing sites and the potential for turbine assembly.

=== Electric Vehicle Production ===
Nissan Motors has announced that Sunderland will be the first European car plant to produce Nissan's electric car, the LEAF. This provides an opportunity to ensure a sustainable future for the city's automotive industry.

=== Health and wellbeing ===
Business activities associated with health and well-being are projected to grow strongly in the city. These could have a double benefit: providing jobs and tackling one of the root causes of unemployment – namely poor health.

=== Creative industries ===
The sector includes art, design, technology and production. The sector fits well with the drive for a more distinctive, waterfront city centre and could support the retention of the younger population, improve the external perceptions of the city and enhance its broader business investment appeal.

== Vision and aims ==
University of Sunderland

The proposed vision is that Sunderland will become:

‘An entrepreneurial university city at the heart of a low carbon regional economy’

The Masterplan vision statement seeks to convey a number of central messages about Sunderland:

- The university will play a new role in the city's economic development
- The city will be a vibrant and attractive place, where enterprise is encouraged
- It will be at the heart of a newly designated “Low Carbon Economic Area” and must develop new infrastructure as part of this
- Its future is tied to the wider economy and the city must be collaborative and outward-looking rather than driven purely by local ambition

Sunderland must focus on a small number of important sectors and on the city centre, and do this by developing a low-carbon economy. It must make more of four key assets:

- Nissan, to exploit electric vehicle technology and become a world leader in producing electric vehicles,
- The University of Sunderland, to redefine the city as a place where knowledge is part of the way of life,
- The port, to enable the servicing of new offshore wind farms,
- Using development sites to create a new business district in the City Centre, more retail sites, and an electric vehicle technopole.

=== Aims ===
The vision for the Sunderland economy will be achieved through five aims:

==== Aim 1 ‘A new kind of university city’ ====
Sunderland is a vibrant, creative and attractive city, with a strong learning ethic and a focus on developing and supporting enterprise, with the University of Sunderland at its heart.

==== Aim 2 ‘A national hub of the low carbon economy’ ====
To use the opportunities offered by new low-carbon technologies to stimulate economic activity in Sunderland. This aim emphasises the city's national potential and the need to showcase projects such as electric vehicles.

==== Aim 3 ‘A prosperous and well-connected waterfront city centre’ ====
The city centre is important to Sunderland and the wider region. It will fulfil its purpose only when more people work in it and more people spend time and money there. The city's position on the waterfront is an important part of its sense of place and enhances Sunderland city centre's distinctive role in the region.

==== Aim 4 ‘An inclusive city economy for all ages’ ====
To improve opportunities for people of all ages and sections of the community, targeting unemployment in particular. “Inclusive” means not just physical accessibility to the city's economic centre but addressing social exclusion. Sunderland should also concentrate on tackling the decline in the number of younger people working and living in the city.

==== Aim 5 ‘A one city approach to economic leadership’ ====
To improve economic leadership in the city.

== Leadership ==
There are three stages to making the Masterplan part of policy:

- Stage 1 - securing stakeholder and political support for the Vision and Aims
- Stage 2 - securing commitment to the Masterplan in economic decision-making
- Stage 3 - aligning policy tools to support the Masterplan

To give clear accountability, Sunderland City Council Cabinet has authorised the formation of an Economic Leadership Board that will be responsible for the Sunderland Economic Masterplan.

== Delivery plans ==
University of Sunderland's CitySpace building

To measure performance against comparable cities, three categories of city have been selected: those that are “in the same boat”, namely Barnsley, Doncaster and Stoke-on-Trent; the “grass is greener” cities of Bolton, Swansea and Wigan, which have outperformed Sunderland economically in recent years; and finally the “rising stars” of Coventry, Derby and Plymouth that have increased population and established themselves on a powerful growth trajectory.

In order to catch up with the “grass is greener” cities and even emulate the “rising stars”, each delivery team has been given a set of performance measures, under each Aim, as follows:

=== Aim 1 ‘A new kind of university city’ ===
Actions: as part of an Enterprise and Innovation Strategy for Sunderland, entrepreneurship development programmes will be put on the city's educational curricula, and provide better support for startups and small and medium-sized enterprises. More knowledge exchange, internships and research opportunities will help businesses benefit from the university.

Performance measures: more VAT registrations, knowledge-based jobs and businesses, R&D investment, educational attainment and demand for university places, plus strategic and practical collaboration between city and university.

=== Aim 2 ‘A national hub of the low-carbon economy’ ===
Actions: partners will work together to support the production of low-carbon vehicles, which companies will be encouraged to use as part of their fleets. The potential of the Port of Sunderland will be assessed to support the development of the offshore wind energy industry. All new commercial premises will be required to show energy efficiency, while people and businesses will be encouraged to reduce their carbon footprints.

Performance measures: more electric vehicles in the city, more green buildings, more jobs in target sectors, more residents, businesses and organisations committing to low-carbon targets, and an increase in installed capacity of renewable or low-carbon energy.

=== Aim 3 ‘A prosperous and well connected waterfront city centre’ ===
Actions: partners will implement the Plan's approach to investment corridors and develop selected sites; events and festivals will animate the city centre.

Performance measures: more city-centre jobs, offices and pedestrian traffic, plus greater diversity of city-centre use, and an improved perception of the city centre among customers and residents.

=== Aim 4 ‘An inclusive city economy – for all ages’ ===
Actions: there will be a skills strategy that ensures that Sunderland has the skilled labour that prospective employers need. Contractors will have incentives to employ local people.

Performance measures: increased employment and earnings; fewer working-age people on benefit; an increase in the 15-35 age group, with more of them in education, employment and training; and better housing, with more homes in Council Tax bands C-H.

== The future ==
Within five years, more people will be setting up their own businesses in Sunderland, with the city centre attracting a growing number of visitors, while the Nissan LEAF becomes an emblem of the city's low-carbon aspirations.

Within 10 years, there will be improved transport infrastructure, more high-speed digital connectivity and an improvement in Sunderland's skills, training programmes and educational attainment.

Within 15 years, Sunderland should look and feel different, with an expanding business district located on the former Vaux site and Farringdon Row, increasing pedestrian traffic in the Minster Quarter and other parts of the city centre, while waterfront cafes and bars begin to appear around the mouth of the Wear.
