= Animal vaccination =

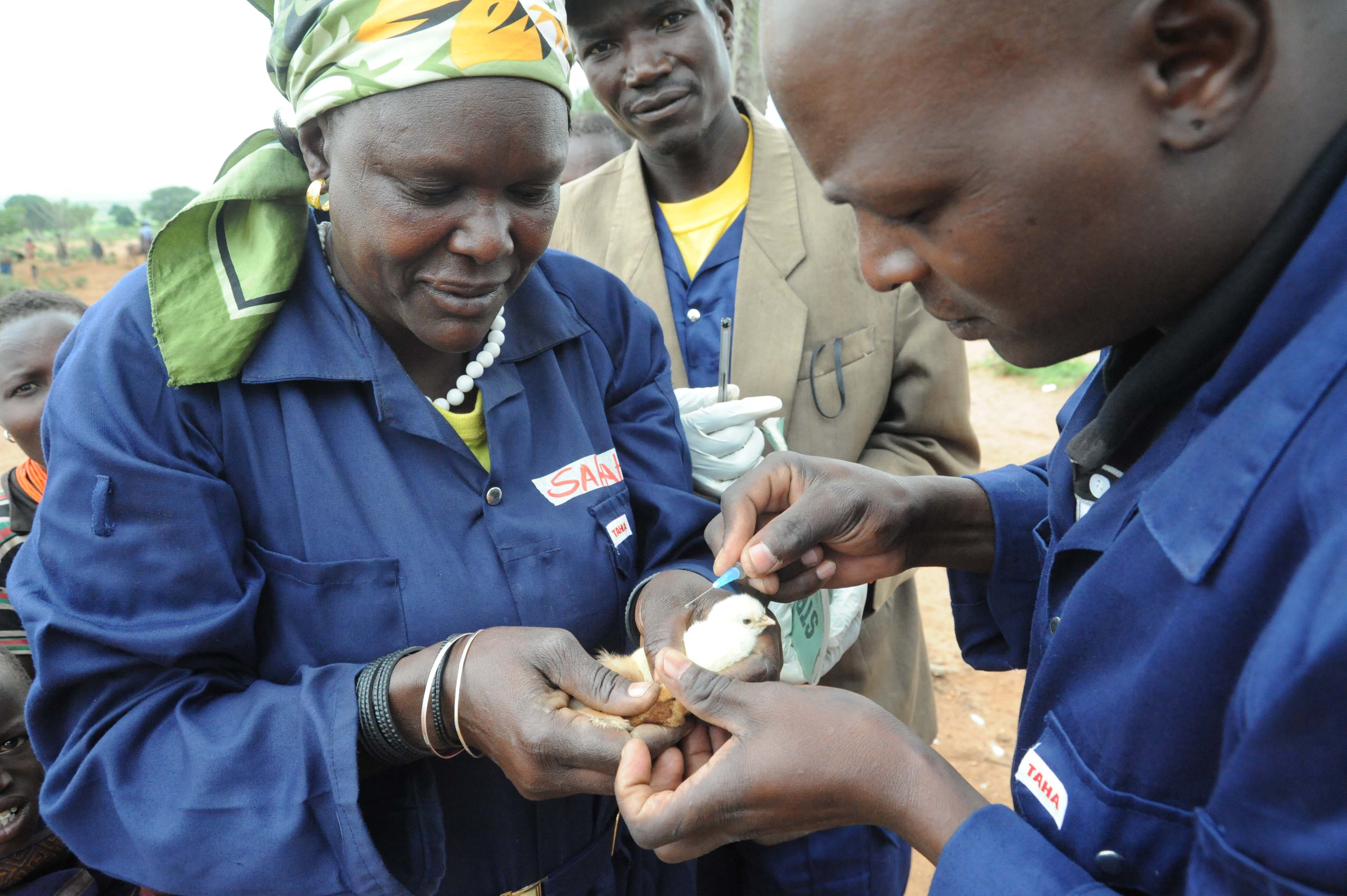
Chicken vaccination

Animal vaccination is the immunisation of a domestic, livestock or wild animal. The practice is connected to veterinary medicine. The first animal vaccine invented was for chicken cholera in 1879 by Louis Pasteur. The production of such vaccines encounter issues in relation to the economic difficulties of individuals, the government and companies. Regulation of animal vaccinations is less compared to the regulations of human vaccinations. Vaccines are categorised into conventional and next generation vaccines. Animal vaccines have been found to be the most cost effective and sustainable methods of controlling infectious veterinary diseases. In 2017, the veterinary vaccine industry was valued at US$7 billion and it is predicted to reach US$9 billion in 2024.

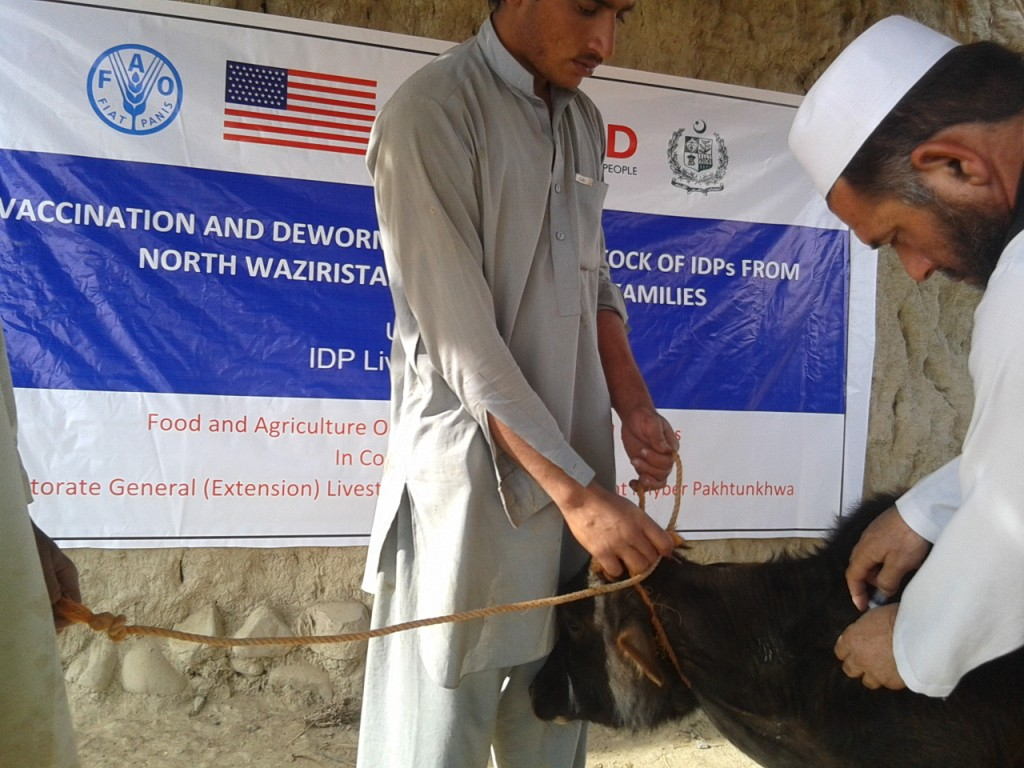
FMD vaccination

== History ==
Animals have been both the receiver and the source of vaccines. Through laboratory testing, the first animal vaccine created was for chicken cholera in 1879 by Louis Pasteur. Pasteur also invented an anthrax vaccine for sheep and cattle in 1881, and the rabies vaccine in 1884. Monkeys and rabbits were used to grow and attenuate the rabies virus. Starting in 1881, dried spinal cord material from infected rabbits was given to dogs to inoculate them against rabies. The infected nerve tissue was dried to weaken the virus. Subsequently, in 1885, the vaccine was given to a 9-year-old boy infected with the rabies disease, Joseph Meister, who survived when no one had before. The French National Academy of Medicine and the world saw this feat as a breakthrough, and thus many scientists started to collaborate and further Pasteur's work.

An indirect view of animal vaccinations is seen through smallpox. This is because the vaccine given to humans was animal based. Smallpox was a deadly disease most known for its rash and high death rate of 30% if contracted.

Edward Jenner tested his theory in 1796, that if a human had already been infected with cowpox that they would be protected from smallpox. It proved to be true and thus started the pathway to the eradication of the disease.

Through the World Health Organization's (WHO) eradication effort, at least 80% of people were vaccinated in every country. Subsequently, case finding and then ring vaccination was used, resulting in smallpox becoming the first eradication of a disease through vaccination in 1980.

== Issues ==
The main issues in relation to the vaccination of animals is access and availability. Vaccines are the most cost-effective measure in preventing disease in livestock populations, although the logistics of distributing vaccines to marginalised populations is still a challenge.

=== Accessibility ===
Most smallholder farmers' (SHFs) livestock in marginalised populations (MPs) die as a result of a disease, they do not reach their full potential, or they transmit a disease. The root of this issue could be prevented or controlled by increasing the accessibility to animal vaccines. Livestock are necessary to an estimated 600 to 900 million poor farmers in the developing world. This is because the animals provide food, income, financial reserve and status.

=== Availability ===
The diseases have been characterised into diseases that cause economic losses, government-controlled diseases, and neglected diseases, which all link to availability. The economic losses category entails necessary vaccines in developing countries normally produced by the private sector that make little to no profit, these companies require community support to continue producing. Whereas, government-controlled diseases are controlled by government policy, the main issue here is if the vaccine is expensive it therefore becomes less available to poor farmers. Furthermore, there are some animal diseases which have been neglected as they mainly only affect poor communities, and thus will not be profitable. This is because producers target the largest markets first to ensure their return on investment (ROI). For example, the reason why dog transmitted rabies is taking time to eradicate is because it only affects the developing world, thus it is not able to be produced on a large and profitable scale.

=== Other issues ===
Some other issues include but are not limited to: economic barriers, political barriers, technical and scientific barriers, regulatory barriers, field use barriers, and social and perception barriers.

== Possible solutions ==
There are possible solutions in terms of the issues in the sector of animal vaccinations. These include innovations in both the scientific and the regulatory fields. It has been suggested that regulations are converged between regions and all animal vaccines can be standardised with the same RNA or DNA backbone. It has been found that there needs to be a better mutual understanding between regulators, academia and industry.

Some other solutions include: free rabies vaccine programs, subsidies as needed, form partnerships across regions (mainly in terms of vaccine banks), a decrease in government taxes, providing positive incentives for disease recording, and building partnerships between global and local manufacturers.

== Human health ==
The production of vaccines for animals and humans has always been linked, this relationship has been coined 'One Health', as at least 61% of all human pathogens originate from animals. Two main examples of this link are the rabies and smallpox vaccines. In many cases vaccinating animals is important not only to the animals' health but also to human health and prosperity. The term zoonotic disease defines a disease that can be transferred from animals to humans.

=== Rabies ===
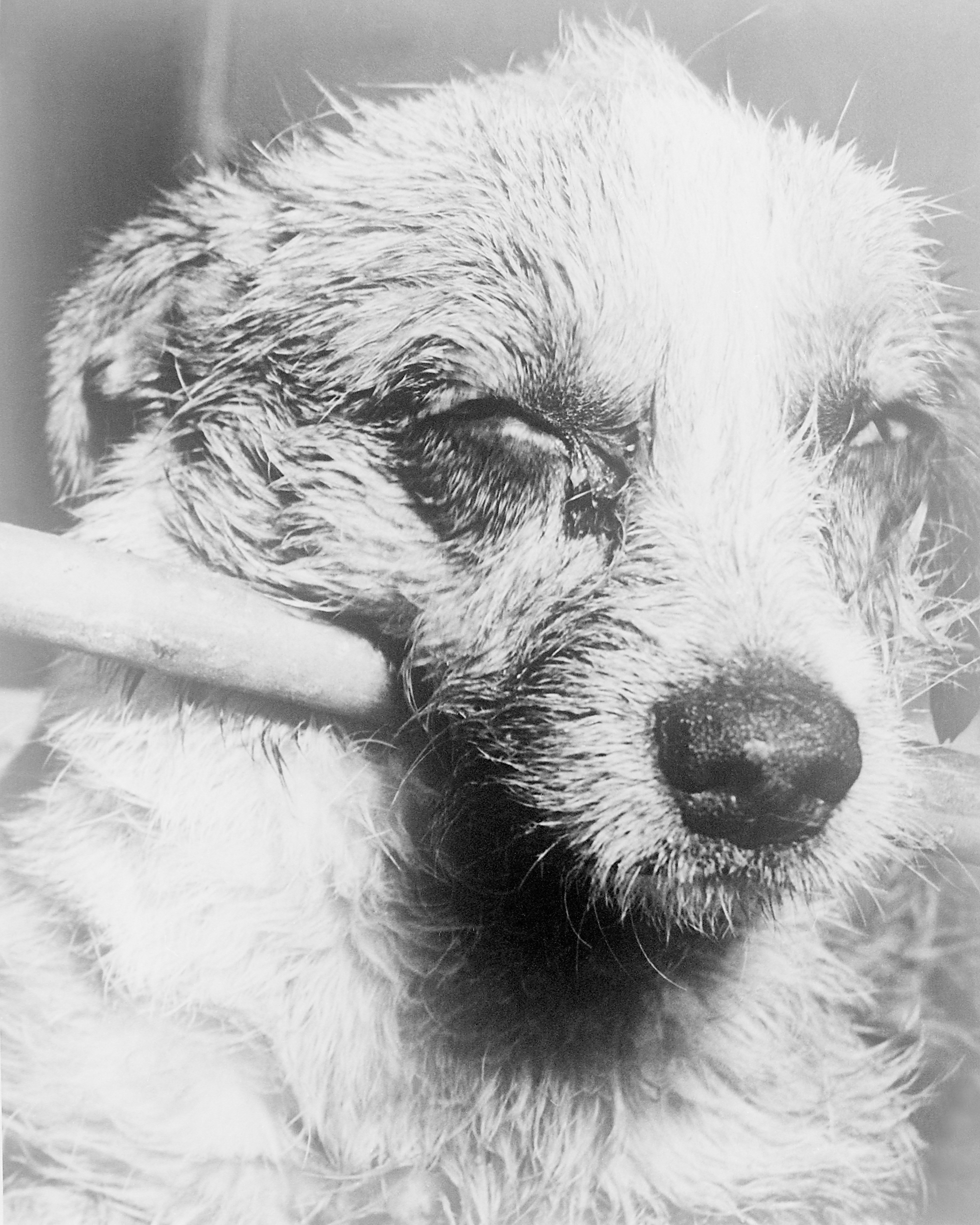
Dog with rabies

A current and prominent example of a zoonotic disease is rabies. It is spread from an animal to humans and other animals through saliva, bites and scratches. Both domestic and wild animals can catch the rabies disease. Over 59,000 humans die of the disease each year, with 99% of cases occurring because of dog bites. There has been less than 20 documented cases of rabies survival without treatment to date. The majority of cases and deaths occur in Africa and Asia, as a result of limited healthcare. The vaccine for rabies can be administered prior or post to being infected, as a result of the long incubation period of the disease.

The proactive approach of vaccinating stray dogs, which helps to prevent the disease at its source, has been seen to be the most cost-effective prevention of rabies. In Bangladesh there was a mass dog vaccination campaign between 2010 and 2013, this resulted in a 50% decrease in rabies-related deaths.

WHO has created the campaign of 'Zero by 30', to reduce the number of humans that die from dog related rabies to zero by 2030.

=== One Health ===
During the last decade 75% of infectious diseases in humans had an animal origin. Thus, the notion coined 'One Health' was created, where both human and animal health is seen as being equally important. An example of a 'One Health' vaccine, where it can be distributed to both humans and animals, that is currently going through clinical trials is Rift Valley Fever. Associate Professor Warimwe from the University of Oxford states that this approach accelerates the design and development of the vaccine, and it also saves time and money.

== Regulation of animal vaccines compared to human vaccines ==
The development of animal vaccines has less regulatory requirements than human vaccines. This has resulted in less time and money involved in the creation and production of animal vaccines. The human vaccine development process generally takes 10 to 15 years, whereas the animal vaccine process only takes an average 5 to 7 years to produce. Albeit, the ability to prioritise potential vaccine targets and the use of studies to test safety is less in the animal vaccine production compared to human vaccines.

=== Prioritisation of potential vaccines ===
Pets has grown at a fast rate over time as owners are concerned for their companion animals' health. In contrast farmed animal vaccines generally only produced when there is a zoonotic disease or it had a significant effect on international trade. Rather than producing for the sole reason of caring for the animal such as with pets, farmed animals are vaccinated for human safety and economic means.

This clearly links to pharmacovigilance (monitoring the effects of licensed drugs). The largest database being the Veterinary Medicines Directorate (VMD) in the UK. Although, the vast majority reported were in terms of companion animals.

There is no standard metric for quantifying the global burden of animal diseases, no standard method for determining the cost effectiveness of a certain animal vaccine, and no cost-effectiveness thresholds in general. Thus, it can be difficult to prioritise animal vaccine development.

=== Studies to test safety ===
As a result of less regulation, some vaccines have been found to contain impurities. An example of this was the rabies vaccine containing a significant amount of Bovine serum albumin (BSA). BSA can cause severe allergic reactions that can lead to death.

== Vaccine production ==
=== Conventional vaccines ===
The main conventional vaccines are Live-attenuated and Inactivated. Live-attenuated vaccines use a weakened form of the virus or bacteria that causes the disease. This form of inoculation is the closest to the actual infection, and thus it has been seen to have a stronger effect than the other types of conventional vaccines. Albeit, there have been some safety issues related to live-attenuated vaccines. There is a potential for unintended outcomes if another being other than the target species takes the vaccine, and there have been instances where this type of vaccine creates false positives when animals are tested and therefore rids a country of their disease free status (as has been seen through Foot and Mouth Disease, FMD). Furthermore, inactivated vaccines consist of bacterians of one or more bacterial species, or killed viral strains. The inactivation occurs through chemical or physical treatment which either denatures the protein or damages the nucleic acid. This type of vaccine is more stable and less expensive than live-attenuated vaccines, although it does not provide as effective long-term protection because the pathogen cannot replicate.

=== Next generation vaccines ===
Genomic analysis of pathogens and furthered understanding of the mechanisms of pathogens has resulted in the discovery of antigens and the development of recombinant veterinary vaccines. Currently the pathogens' genome is sequenced, the genes that cause the disease is identified, the genes of interest are cloned, a recombinant is constructed, and then one of three types of vaccines is produced (DNA vaccines, Subunit vaccines, Vectored vaccines). DNA vaccines induce antigen production in the host. It is a plasmid that contains a viral, bacterial or parasite gene. The animal's immune system recognises the expressed protein as foreign, and this can lead to a cellular or humeral response. DNA vaccines overcomes the safety concerns of live-attenuated vaccines. Furthermore, subunit vaccines are short, specific pathogens that cannot replicate. Even though this vaccine is termed as safe, it does not replicate and thus studies have shown issues in relation to yield. Vectored vaccines is another next generation vaccine. This type of vaccine uses a vector to deliver either one or multiple proteins to the immune system of the animal. Currently, there is research being undergone into plant vaccines, which come under the category of vector vaccines.

Domestic chickens have been vaccinated against Pasteurella anatis using bacterial outer membrane vesicles purified by hydrostatic filtration dialysis. Several such vaccines have successfully produced immunity. Antenucci et al. 2020 demonstrates the most consistent product and effective immune provocation among HFD OMV processes, but overall HFD has yet to prove itself against other vaccine production techniques. Nonetheless, it is a promising line of research as of 2021.

== Vaccinating companion animals ==
The Vaccinations Guidelines Group (VGG) of the World Small Animal Veterinary Association (WSAVA) have defined the core, non-core and not recommended vaccinations for dogs and cats.

Core vaccines protect animals against severe global diseases. Where rabies is endemic the associated vaccine is treated as being in the core category.

Dog and Cat Vaccinations
	Core	Non-Core	Not Recommended
Dogs	Canine distemper virus (CDV) Canine adenovirus (CAV) Canine Parvovirus (CPV-2)	Parainfluenza virus (PI) Bordetella bronchiseptica (Bb) Leptospira interrogans	Coronavirus
Cats	Feline parvovirus (FPV) Feline calicivirus (FCV) Feline herpesvirus (FHV-1)	Feline leukaemia virus (FeLV) Chlamydia felis Feline immunodeficiency virus (FIV)	

== See also ==
- Vaccination of dogs
- Feline vaccination (vaccination of cats)
- Rabies vaccine
- Wildlife disease
- Beef cattle vaccination in Australia
