= DA2PPC vaccine =

Multivalent vaccine for dogs

DA2PP is a multivalent vaccine for dogs that protects against the viruses indicated by the alphanumeric characters forming the abbreviation: D for canine distemper, A2 for canine adenovirus type 2, which offers cross-protection to canine adenovirus type 1 (the more pathogenic of the two strains) (see Canine adenovirus), the first P for canine parvovirus, and the second P for parainfluenza. Because infectious canine hepatitis is another name for canine adenovirus type 1, an H is sometimes used instead of A. In DA2PPC, the C indicates canine coronavirus. This is not considered a core vaccination and is therefore often excluded from the abbreviation.

This vaccine is usually given to puppies at 6–8 weeks of age, followed by 10–12 weeks of age, and then 14–16 weeks of age. This vaccine is given again at 1 year of age and then annually, or every 3 years depending on local and national laws. Some veterinarians' recommended vaccine schedules may differ from this.

DA2PPC does not include vaccination against Bordetella, but the combination of Bordetella with DA2PPC significantly reduces kennel cough infection through prevention of adenovirus, distemper, and parainfluenza.

DHPP, DAPP and DA2PP are the same. But those three and DAPPC are not the same. The names are often used interchangeably but they are different. Distemper, adenovirus type 1 (thus hepatitis), parainfluenza, and parvovirus are covered by all 4, but only DAPPC covers coronavirus.

== Core vs. non-core vaccines ==
Core vaccinations are almost always necessary for the long-term wellbeing of the life of a dog. Non-core vaccinations are there for preventative measures that may protect against deadly diseases that the dog may encounter in their lifespan.

*: Included in DA2PPC

Core Vaccines	Non-Core Vaccines
Distemper*	Bordetella
Parvovirus*	Leptospirosis
Adenovirus (Hepatitis)*	Lyme disease
Rabies	Parainfluenza*
	Coronavirus*

== Distemper ==
The DA2PPC vaccine protects against the debilitating and deadly disease canine distemper. This disease is a fatal viral illness that causes neurologic dysfunction, pneumonia, nonspecific systemic symptoms such as fever and fatigue, and weight loss, as well as upper respiratory symptoms and diarrhea, poor appetite, and vomiting. There is no antiviral drug effective against the canine distemper virus. Treatment is supportive and consists of antibiotics to prevent secondary infections, anticonvulsants for seizures, and intravenous fluids to prevent dehydration. Given the lethality of distemper and the relative rarity of side effects from the vaccine, all reputable veterinarians recommend the DA2PPC vaccine. It is recommended that the pet owner vaccinate for distemper even if the other preventatives are not a concern.

== Adenovirus ==
Adenovirus is prevented by the DA2PPC vaccine representing the adenovirus type 2. Adenovirus type 2 is responsible for the infectious, viral disease kennel cough. This is an upper respiratory disease most associated with bronchitis and bronchiolitis (swelling of the bronchial tubes). Unvaccinated dogs and puppies are most susceptible to the disease. DA2PPC also protects against the more virulent strain, adenovirus Type 1 (see canine adenovirus). Type 1 adenovirus, also called canine hepatitis, is a DNA viral upper respiratory infection contracted through contact of a mucous membrane. Symptoms include: vomiting, diarrhea, lethargy, swollen lymph nodes, abdominal pain, and an enlarged liver.

== Parvovirus ==
DA2PPC vaccine is a preventive measure against parvovirus, one of the most important diseases the vaccine protects a puppy against. Parvovirus causes lethargy, abdominal pain, vomiting, bloody stool, and fever. The persistent loss of fluid leads to dehydration and septic shock which is often fatal. Parvo is contracted by dog-to-dog contact, contaminated fecal matter, water or food bowls, shared items, and even the clothing and floor of people who have handled dogs with parvovirus previously. (see canine parvovirus) Puppies under 4 months old and unvaccinated canines are the most susceptible to the disease.

== Parainfluenza ==
The second P in DA2PPC stands for parainfluenza. The vaccine helps protect against the highly contagious virus that is characterized by fever, runny nose, loss of appetite, lethargy, sneezing, and most notably, a dry cough. The parainfluenza virus is one of the many canine viral strains that can cause kennel cough. The disease is passed from dog-to-dog by close spaces such as boarding venues, kennels, pounds, pet shops and contacted with infected material like bedding or through mucous membrane secretions like coughing or sneezing of the infected dog.

== Coronavirus ==
This is least of the concerns for pet owners when considering the vaccination DA2PPC. The vaccine is simply a preventative measure, but does not prevent the disease completely. Like the others, coronavirus is transmitted through contaminated fecal material, food or water bowls, or contact with a previously infected dog. Puppies are the most susceptible but the disease only lasts about 24 hours and is characterized by lethargy, loss of appetite, and potent smelling, loose stool. It is not a zoonotic disease. (see also coronavirus)
