= Vaccination of dogs =

Animal vaccination

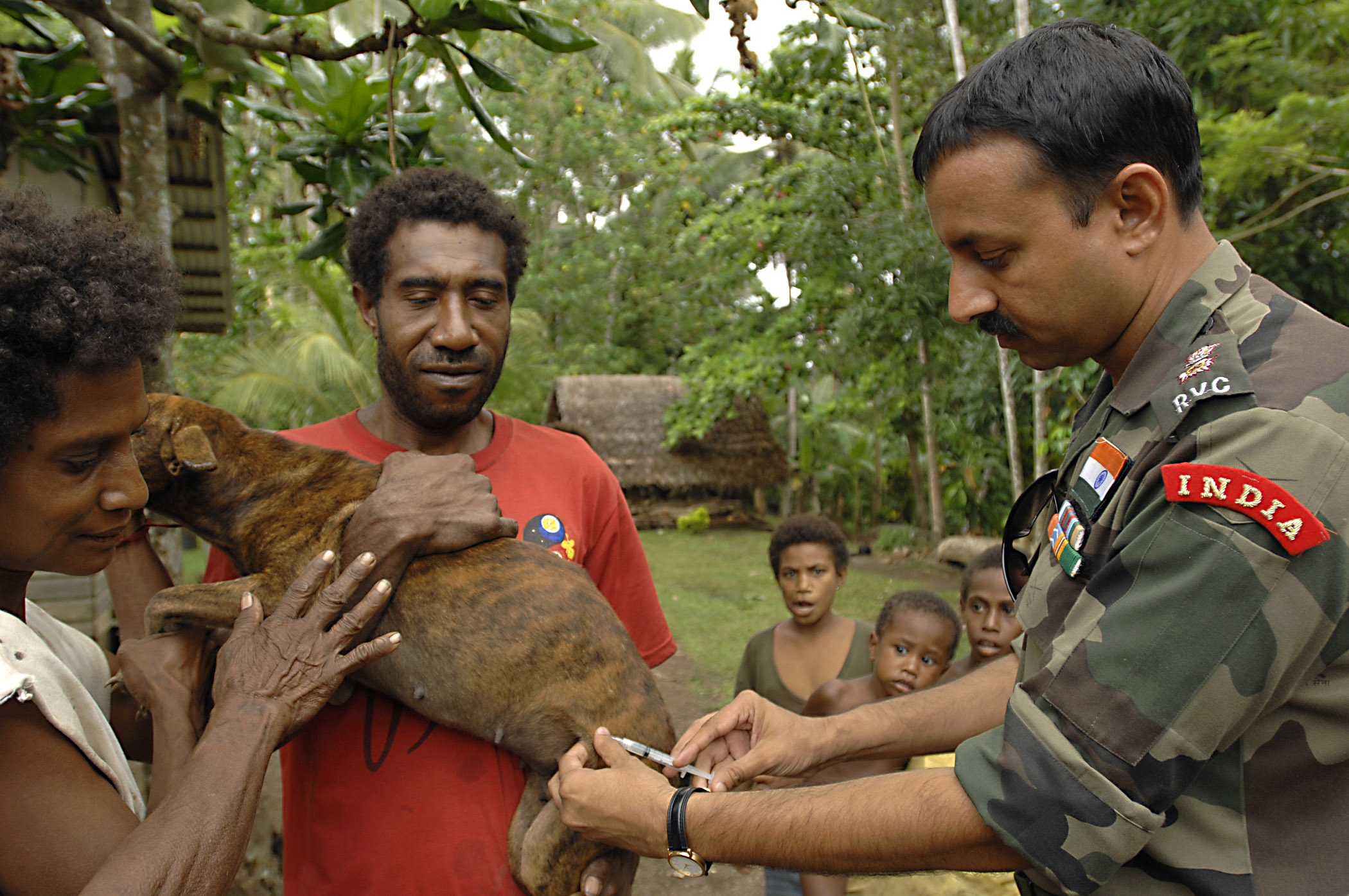
Dog vaccination against rabies

Vaccination of dogs is the practice of animal vaccination applied to dogs. Programs in this field have contributed both to the health of dogs and to the public health. In countries where routine rabies vaccination of dogs is practiced, for example, rabies in humans is reduced to a very rare event.

Currently, there are geographically defined core vaccines and individually chosen non-core vaccine recommendations for dogs. A number of controversies surrounding adverse reactions to vaccines have resulted in authoritative bodies revising their guidelines as to the type, frequency, and methods/locations for dog vaccination.

== Recommended administration of vaccines ==
In 2010 and 2011, revised guidelines addressed concerns about adverse vaccine reactions by altering the recommended frequency, type, methods, and locations for administration of core and non-core canine vaccines.

=== General schedule ===
Most vaccination protocols recommend a series of vaccines for puppies, with vaccine boosters given at 11-13 weeks, then at 15-17 weeks and so on. Frequency of vaccination thereafter varies depending on the lifestyle of the individual dog, including:

- indoor vs. outdoor
- travel plans
- kennel/boarding plans
- underlying disease conditions
- other exposure risks
- the disease and vaccine type

Because these factors may change over time, many professional organizations recommend routine annual examinations, where a vaccination plan for each individual canine can be decided during a discussion between the veterinarian and dog owner.

=== Type ===
In their 2010 recommendations, WSAVA (World Small Animal Veterinary Association) emphasized the importance of administering non-adjuvanted vaccines whenever possible, as vaccines that included these immune-stimulating agents were shown to increase adverse vaccine reactions in pets.

=== Frequency ===
WSAVA also prefers serological testing over unnecessary boosters or re-vaccination doses of core vaccines after the initial 12-month booster that follows the puppy series of modified live virus [MLV] vaccines. This is because core vaccines show an excellent correlation between the presence of antibody and protective immunity to a disease, and have a long DOI (Duration of Immunity). Antibody tests can be used to demonstrate the DOI after vaccination with core vaccines, though not for non-core vaccines (such as parainfluenza).

=== Method ===
Most vaccines are given by subcutaneous (under the skin) or intramuscular (into the muscle) injection. Respiratory tract disease vaccination may be given intra-nasally (in the nose) in some cases.

=== Location ===
Many recent protocols indicate that vaccines should be given in specific areas in order to ease identification of which vaccine caused an adverse reaction and ease removal of any vaccine-associated sarcoma. Although these protocols were initially designed for cats, some similar protocols are likely to be developed for canines, as well.

In North America, veterinarians adopted the practice of injecting specific limbs as far from the trunk of the body as possible, for example the rear right limb for rabies.

This set of locations was not widely adopted outside of North America, and the international Vaccination Guidelines Group (VGG) made new recommendations that vaccines be administered:

- in subcutaneous (and not intramuscular) sites
- in the skin of the lateral thorax or abdomen (for easier excision of any FISS that occur)
- so as to avoid the interscapular or intercostal regions (as more extensive surgical resection would be needed for sarcomas)
- in a different site on each occasion (either with general locations per species per year or diagrams of where administered on specific visit)

=== Core vaccines ===
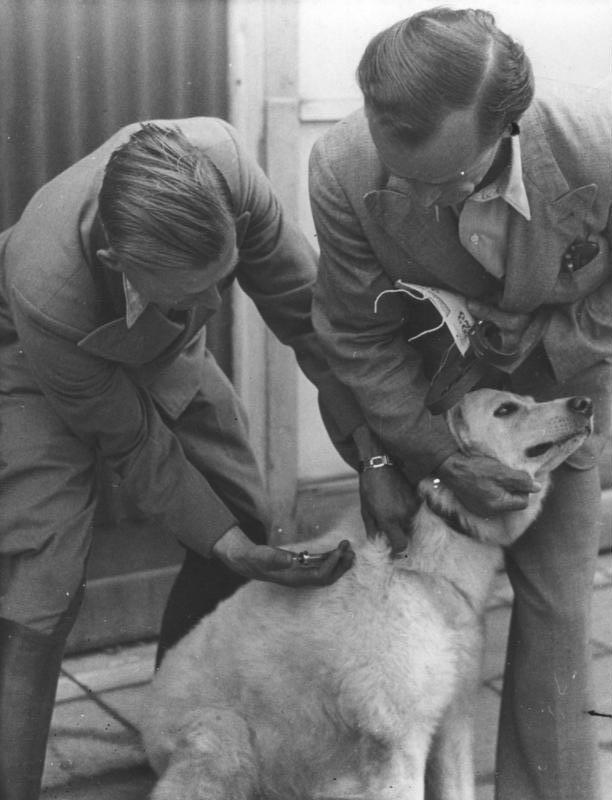
Dog vaccination against canine distemper

Core vaccines are defined as those vaccines which all dogs, regardless of circumstances, should receive. Core vaccines protect animals from severe, life-threatening diseases which have global distribution.

==== Rabies ====
The 2011 North American recommendation includes rabies in the core vaccines. Likewise, the National Association of State Public Health Veterinarians (NASPHV) in the U.S. gives detailed instructions on how to deal with what they describe as a serious public health problem, and includes a useful table, summarizing all the rabies vaccines sold in the U.S.

The 2010 international VGG recommendation generally considers the rabies vaccine a non-core vaccine, except in areas where the disease is endemic or where required by law.

==== CDV/CAV-2/CPV-2 ====
In many locations the rabies vaccine is accompanied by a single combined vaccine shot which protects against:

- CDV (canine distemper),
- CAV-2 (canine hepatitis virus or adenovirus-2) and
- CPV-2 (canine parvovirus).

This combination vaccine may also be known as DHPP or DAPP.

=== Non-Core vaccines ===
Non-core vaccines are those that are required by only those animals whose geographical location, local environment or lifestyle places them at risk of contracting specific infections.

- Except in areas where the disease is endemic or where required by law, the VGG considers the rabies vaccine as non-core.
- Both of the most recent vaccine protocols no longer consider canine parainfluenza to be a core vaccine and have moved CPiV into the non-core category.
- For dogs expected to board, be shown, or to enter a kennel situation within 6 months, vets may recommend administering a vaccine against the bacteria Bordetella, which causes respiratory illness commonly known as "kennel cough" in addition to canine parainfluenza virus (another kennel cough agent).
- Vaccination against Lyme disease, an illness that is spread via deer ticks, is also indicated in certain environments where deer ticks frequently occur. Lyme disease is known to cause lethargy, fever, soreness, and in cases left untreated, damage to joints, paralysis, and nerve damage.
- For dogs living in/visiting rural areas or areas frequented by wildlife, another vaccine is available against Leptospirosis, a disease characterized by weakness, vomiting, fever, abdominal pain, and kidney and liver failure. Leptospirosis comes from standing water containing urine from animals infected with the bacteria Leptospira, and the disease can be transmitted to humans via contaminated water or food.

=== Not recommended vaccines ===
Generally not recommended, owing to unproven efficacy, are vaccines for:

- canine coronavirus,
- canine adenovirus-1 (which also causes significant reaction),
- Giardia

== Controversy ==
Specific adverse reactions and general consequences for long-term health and immunity are both being cited as reasons to reduce the frequency of pet vaccination.

The 2010 vaccination guidelines published by the WSAVA (World Small Animal Veterinary Association) reduce the number of vaccines which should be considered core for canines, as well as recommending less frequent vaccine administration.

In the executive summary section, the WSAVA guidelines argue in support of "the development and use of simple in-practice tests for determination of seroconversion (antibody) following vaccination." They also note that "Vaccines should not be given needlessly. Core vaccines should not be given any more frequently than every three years after the 12 month booster injection following the puppy/kitten series, because the duration of immunity (DOI) is many years and may be up to the lifetime of the pet." The open letter critique focuses on the less-nuanced summary of these recommendations in the tables given for vaccination guidelines, which could imply that re-vaccination should occur every three years.

== Adverse reactions ==
Vets and owners should also consider factors that have been shown to increase the risk of adverse vaccine reactions. Examples of such factors include:

- age,
- number of vaccinations per office visit,
- size,
- type or ingredients of vaccine itself,
- breed,
- neutered status,
- general health of the dog, and
- past vaccination history.

Vaccine-induced vasculitis is a form of alopecia that occurs after vaccination, often due to rabies vaccination. It may occur 2-3 months after vaccination.

== See also ==
- ATCvet code QI07 Immunologicals for canidae (a list of ATCvet codes for canine vaccines)
- DA2PPC Vaccine
- Feline vaccination
