= CSL Behring =

Biopharmaceutical company

CSL Behring LLC
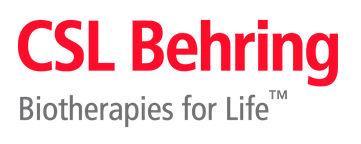
- Traded as: ASX: CSL
- Industry: Biopharmaceutical, health care
- Headquarters: King of Prussia, Pennsylvania
- Key people: Paul McKenzie, CEO and Managing Director of CSL Limited
- Number of employees: 27,000+
- Parent: CSL Limited
- Website: www.cslbehring.com

CSL Behring is a biopharmaceutical company, manufacturing plasma-derived and recombinant therapeutic products. The company is a combination of Behringwerke, founded in 1904 in Marburg, Germany by Emil von Behring, and the Commonwealth Serum Laboratories (CSL), established in Australia in 1916 to provide vaccines to the people of Australia, as well as other companies acquired since 2004.

== About ==
CSL Behring's parent company, CSL Limited, is headquartered in Melbourne, Victoria, Australia. Previously known as ZLB Behring, the company's history dates back to 1904 when Behringwerke was founded in Germany by Emil von Behring, winner of the first Nobel Prize in Medicine as the inventor of serum therapy or serology. The CSL Behring brand was established in 2007.

CSL Behring operates CSL Plasma. It has over 12,000 employees and more than 270 plasma collection centres covering China, the US, and Europe.

== History ==
In 1904, Von Behring founded the Behringwerke in Marburg, Germany, for experimental work on disease prevention and the manufacturing of sera and vaccines. In 1913, Behringwerke expanded to produce a gas gangrene antiserum and a cholera vaccine.

The Commonwealth Serum Laboratories (now CSL Ltd.) were established in Australia in 1916 to provide vaccines to the people of Australia and New Zealand. In 1930, CSL released an antivenom for tiger snake bites. In 1944, CSL began producing penicillin for the Australian military.

In 1954, Australian CSL officer Val Bazeley assisted Jonas Salk in producing the experimental polio vaccine used in the first clinical trials in the US. Bazeley returned to Australia to set up production of the Salk vaccine at CSL.

In 1981, Behringwerke introduced Haemate, a human plasma coagulation factor VIII/von Willebrand factor complex, for the treatment of patients with Hemophilia A.

In 1991, CSL Limited was incorporated in Australia. The company went private in 1994 and was listed on the Australian Stock Exchange.

In 2007, ZLB Behring became CSL Behring. In 2009, ZLB Plasma changed its name to CSL Plasma to align with its parent company and opened plasma testing laboratories in Knoxville, Tennessee. That same year, the National Organization for Rare Disorders (NORD) recognised CSL Behring for developing and marketing a treatment in the U.S. for acute bleeding episodes in patients with congenital fibrinogen deficiency, and the Swiss government awarded CSL Behring the Tell Award.

In 2012, the European Organisation for Rare Diseases recognised CSL Behring for developing and manufacturing therapies to treat rare and serious medical conditions with the 2012 EURORDIS Company Award.

== Sales and acquisitions ==
Over the past century, CSL Behring has acquired:

In 2000, the company acquired ZLB from the Swiss Red Cross for $525 million. U.S. plasma collector Nabi, which helped form the world's largest plasma collection network in CSL Plasma, was acquired in 2001.

The company sold Animal Health and acquired the U.S. coagulation-therapy maker Aventis Behring in 2004 for $925 million combining it with ZLB Bioplasma to create ZLB Behring (later CSL Behring). The following year the company sold JRH Biosciences, which the company had acquired in 1994.

Zenyth Therapeutics was acquired in 2006.

Calimmune, a leader in gene-modification and cell-delivery technology, was acquired in 2020 for a reported $91 million.

In 2020, CSL Behring picked up a 2017 option agreement and acquired Vitaeris, a biopharmaceutical company focused on the development of Clazakizumab as a potential treatment option for organ transplant recipients experiencing rejection.

In August 2022, the company finalized its purchase of Vifor Pharma for a reported $11.7 billion.

== Offices ==
The company's United States headquarters are in King of Prussia, Pennsylvania. It has 27,000+ employees in 30 countries. Major manufacturing centers are located in Bern, Switzerland;Marburg, Germany; Kankakee, Illinois; and Broadmeadows, Australia.
