= Infectious necrotic hepatitis =

Bacterial disease of animals

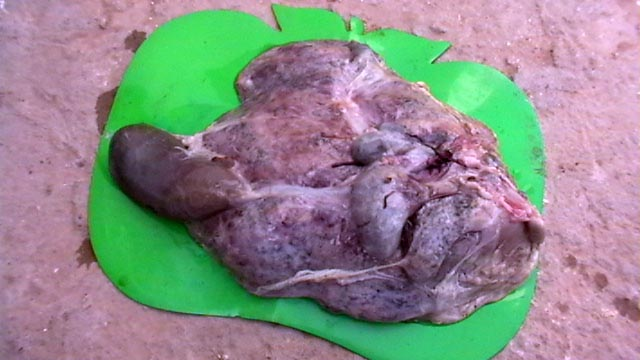
Liver of sheep dying from infectious necrotic hepatitis

Infectious necrotic hepatitis is a disease of large animals, especially sheep, caused by Clostridium novyi infection. The primary infection is intestinal and transferred by the faecal-oral route. Spores of C. novyi escape from the gut and lodge in the liver, where they remain dormant until some injury creates anaerobic conditions for them to germinate, causing local necrosis and widespread damage to the microvascular system, resulting in subcutaneous bleeding and blackening of the skin, hence the common name "black disease".

== In sheep ==
In sheep, the disease, referred to as "black disease", results from interaction of bacteria (especially C. novyi) and liver fluke (Fasciola hepatica).

=== Symptoms ===
As with other enterotoxemias, the disease leads to sudden death. Nevertheless, sheep with previous vaccination can show a protracted course. The rest of the flock may show loss of appetite and pica.

=== Post-mortem lesions ===
Peritoneal and thoracic cavities contains a great quantity of fluids, as does the pericardial sac.

The liver is sometimes swollen with perihepatitis. There appear a great number of necrotic foci, 3 to 4 mm diameter, which extend deeply in the organ. Hepatic lymph nodes are enlarged. The gallbladder is full.

Subcutaneous tissues are full of cyanotic venous blood. They may darken the hide, hence the name "black disease".

=== Control ===
In order to control for the disease, the Lymnaea spp snails, which are the intermediate host for the liver flukes, need to be controlled. There are three ways that have proven most effective when controlling the snail populations:

- The first is by treating pastures and water channels with copper sulfate. This method is not always practical, because it is too expensive to treat in large areas. Lack of cooperation between neighbors is also a problem, snails are easily transported, and treated pastures become re-infested by neighboring fields and streams.
- Drenching the sheep with carbon tetra-chloride in paraffin oil has proven to be an alternative. However, drenching in more than recommended doses can be fatal, by causing liver damage, which could initiate the disease in sheep carrying B. oedematiens spores.
- Drainage is an effective option to eliminate the snails. However, draining the places where the grass grows eliminates a source of food for the sheep and creates other unwanted problems.
