= CSL Plasma =

Plasmapheresis company based in Florida

Coordinates: 26°23′55″N 80°06′22″W

CSL Plasma Inc
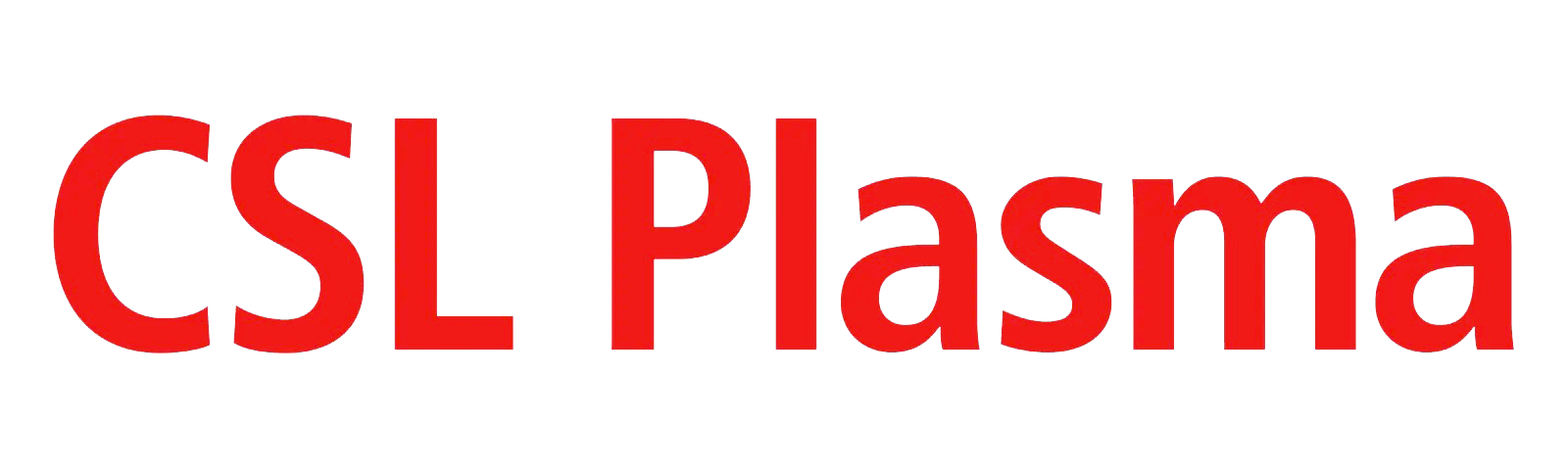

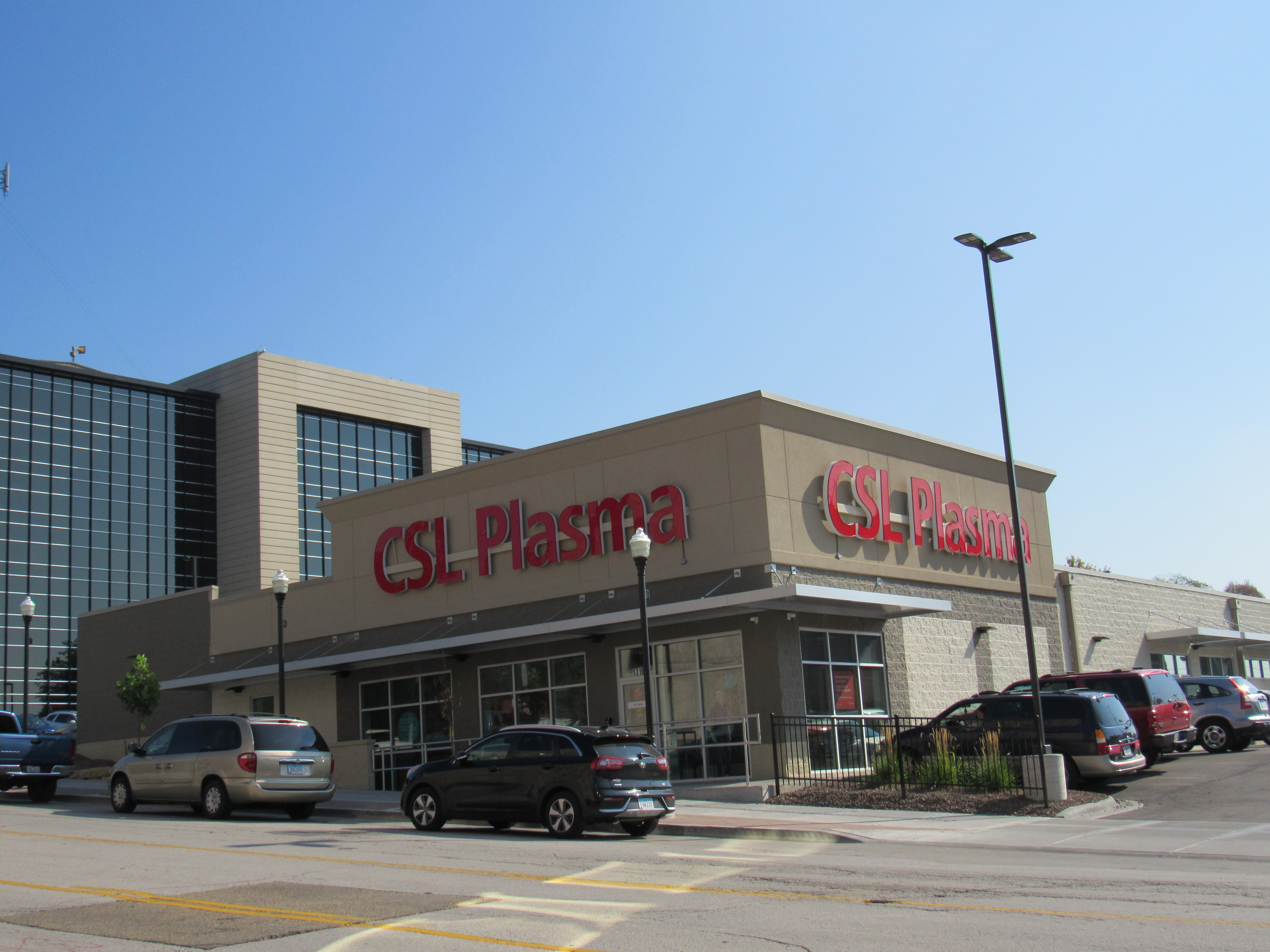
- A plasma collection location in Davenport, Iowa
- Traded as: ASX: CSL
- Industry: Plasmapheresis, Biopharmaceutical
- Headquarters: Boca Raton, Florida
- Key people: Paul McKenzie (CSL CEO)
- Number of employees: 17,000+
- Parent: CSL Limited
- Website: www.cslplasma.com

CSL Plasma is a plasmapheresis company which claims to be one of the largest companies of its kind in the world. It is a subsidiary of CSL Limited, a biotechnology company based in Melbourne, Australia, but has its own headquarters in Boca Raton, Florida. The company employs around 17,000 staff and has over 300 locations in multiple countries. Collected plasma, encouraged through company-sponsored programs such as "Plasma P.A.L.S.", is used for testing or manufacturing plasma-derived therapies and medicine. The company was a finalist in the 2021 and 2022 South Florida Business Journal "Business of the Year Awards". In 2023, the company was made to make settlements in two discrimination lawsuits.

== Overview ==
CSL Plasma is a subsidiary of its sister company CSL Behring, itself a subsidiary of CSL Limited, a biotechnology company based in Melbourne, Australia. It is headquartered in Boca Raton, Florida, and operates a total of 320 collection centers in the United States, and a further 19 more in other nations including China, Hungary, and Germany as of 2023. It employs around 17,000 employees as medical staff, phlebotomists, plasma processors, operation managers, and receptionists, with each location requiring around 50 staff members to operate.

== Plasma collection ==
CSL Plasma advertises itself as being open to the general public with some exceptions, with requirements for donors on its website including the donor must be in good health, be 18 years of age or older, weigh at least 110 lb (50 kg), have no piercings or tattoos within the last four months, and have a valid government-issued ID, Social Security number, and address. It is recommended all donors also avoid alcohol for 24 hours and smoking for 3 hours before donating. The company uses the Rika Plasma Donation System to collect plasma from donors in a process that takes around 25 minutes. Some locations are equipped to hold up to 48 donation beds, allowing multiple donations to take place at a time in one location.

Collected plasma is then either sent to a CSL Plasma testing laboratory or CSL Behring, where it is used for testing or manufacturing plasma-derived therapies and medicine. Specific therapies include those treating hemophilia, primary immunodeficiency, von Willebrand disease, hereditary angioedema, hereditary respiratory disease, and neurological disorders; as well as in burn, cardiac, major trauma, and organ transplants surgeries. Due to health concerns, a donor's first donation cannot be used until a second donation is given. A monetary reward is given as an incentive for first-time donors, which is given on a reloadable prepaid card. A loyalty program named "iGive Rewards" also exists for returning donors. Staff members have been known to donate in their free time. CLS Plasma offers a referral program that allows existing donors to refer new donors and receive a referral reward.

== Programs and initiatives ==
CSL Plasma runs a program called "Plasma Patients And Life-Savers" or "Plasma P.A.L.S." (previously called "Adopt-A-Patient" before September 2022) where plasma donors meet regular patients of plasma therapy, who tell their story to raise awareness and encourage donating. Around Easter, certain locations have hosted egg hunts.

At the beginning of the Russian invasion of Ukraine in 2022, the company partnered with humanitarian organizations including the World Health Organization, Red Cross, Doctors Without Borders, and UNICEF to provide medication to impacted civilians and refugees. The company had previously partnered with the Red Cross to help provide relief after natural disasters including fires, hurricanes, and tornadoes that affected donation areas and staff.

== Reception ==
CSL Plasma was a finalist in the South Florida Business Journal's 2021 and 2022 "Business of the Year Awards" in the business category based on revenue.

=== Controversies ===
In January 2020, CSL Plasma was sued after misdiagnosing an Illinois man with HIV after a blood test and notifying the Food and Drug Administration before it was confirmed it was a false positive.

In August 2023, CSL Plasma satisfied an agreement to end two Minnesota court cases from March and November 2019, moving to bar facilities from preventing potential donors from donating based on gender identity. In December 2023, a settlement was reached in an Illinois lawsuit that alleged CSL Plasma had violated the Americans with Disabilities Act and Illinois Human Rights Act after discriminating against disabled potential donors, leading CSL Plasma to adopt new policies for potential donors who are deaf or require a service animal.

In January 2024, emergency medical support had to be provided to a donor in Maine after certain unspecified equipment was missing from the collection facility, closing it until a replacement arrived.
