= Cattle tick =

Cattle tick can refer to any of several species of ticks that parasitize cattle, including:

- Haemaphysalis longicornis, the Asian longhorned tick
- Rhipicephalus annulatus, the North American cattle tick
- Rhipicephalus microplus, the Asian blue tick
