= Malignant edema =

Type of wound infection in grazing animals

Malignant edema (or malignant oedema) is an acute, generally rapidly fatal wound infection (toxemia) most common in grazing animals. It affects cattle, horses, sheep, goats, pigs, and deer. It is caused by one or more species of bacteria in the genus Clostridium.

"A similar infection in humans is not uncommon."
