= Stadium Village, Minneapolis =

Area of Minneapolis, Minnesota, US

Coordinates: 44.9747°N 93.2229°W

Stadium Village
- Commercial District
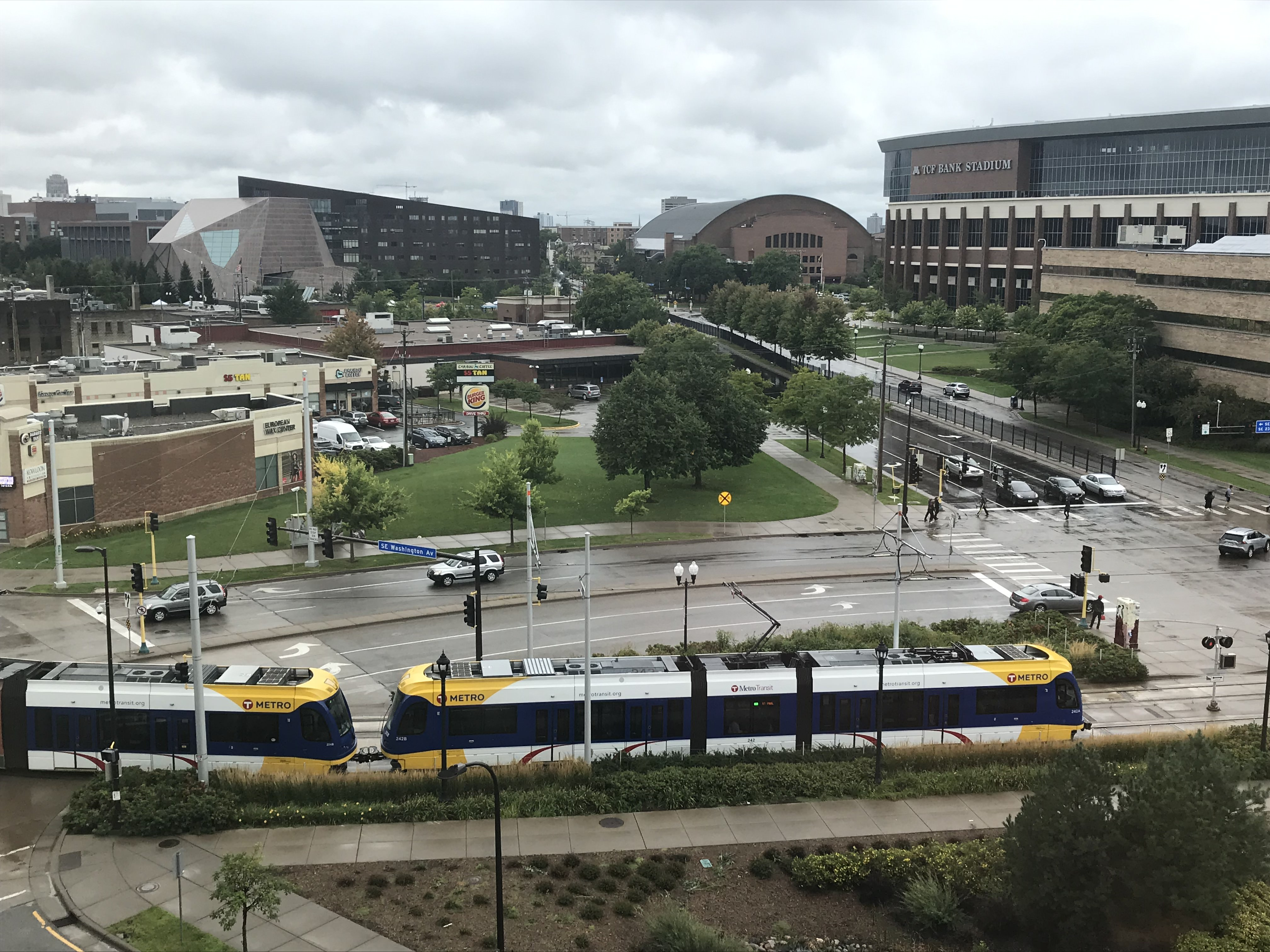
- Stadium Village includes multiple stadiums and the Green Line light rail.
- Interactive map of Stadium Village
- Country: United States
- State: Minnesota
- County: Hennepin County
- City: Minneapolis

Stadium Village is an area of Minneapolis, Minnesota near the East Bank campus of the University of Minnesota. While not an official neighborhood of Minneapolis, the area is an important commercial district that serves university students with many bars and restaurants. There are plans to incorporate it into an official neighborhood of Minneapolis along with the surrounding area. It is part of Southeast Minneapolis, that part of Minneapolis on the East Bank of the Mississippi River and south of Hennepin Avenue

The neighborhood is centered roughly around the intersection of Oak Street SE and Washington Avenue SE in Minneapolis. Further west on University Avenue is the Dinkytown neighborhood.

The name of the area is a reference to the old Memorial Stadium, which was no longer used after the 1981 football season, since the University of Minnesota football team began playing in Metrodome, in downtown Minneapolis. Memorial Stadium was demolished in 1992. The area was built around the stadium and kept its name even after the stadium was replaced by the University of Minnesota Aquatic Center and McNamara Alumni Center. The other University of Minnesota sports arenas are also nearby. In 2009, TCF Bank Stadium opened, near the site of the old Memorial Stadium. The University of Minnesota placed billboards promoting the new stadium with a slogan of "Stadium Village – Now with stadium".

== Gallery ==
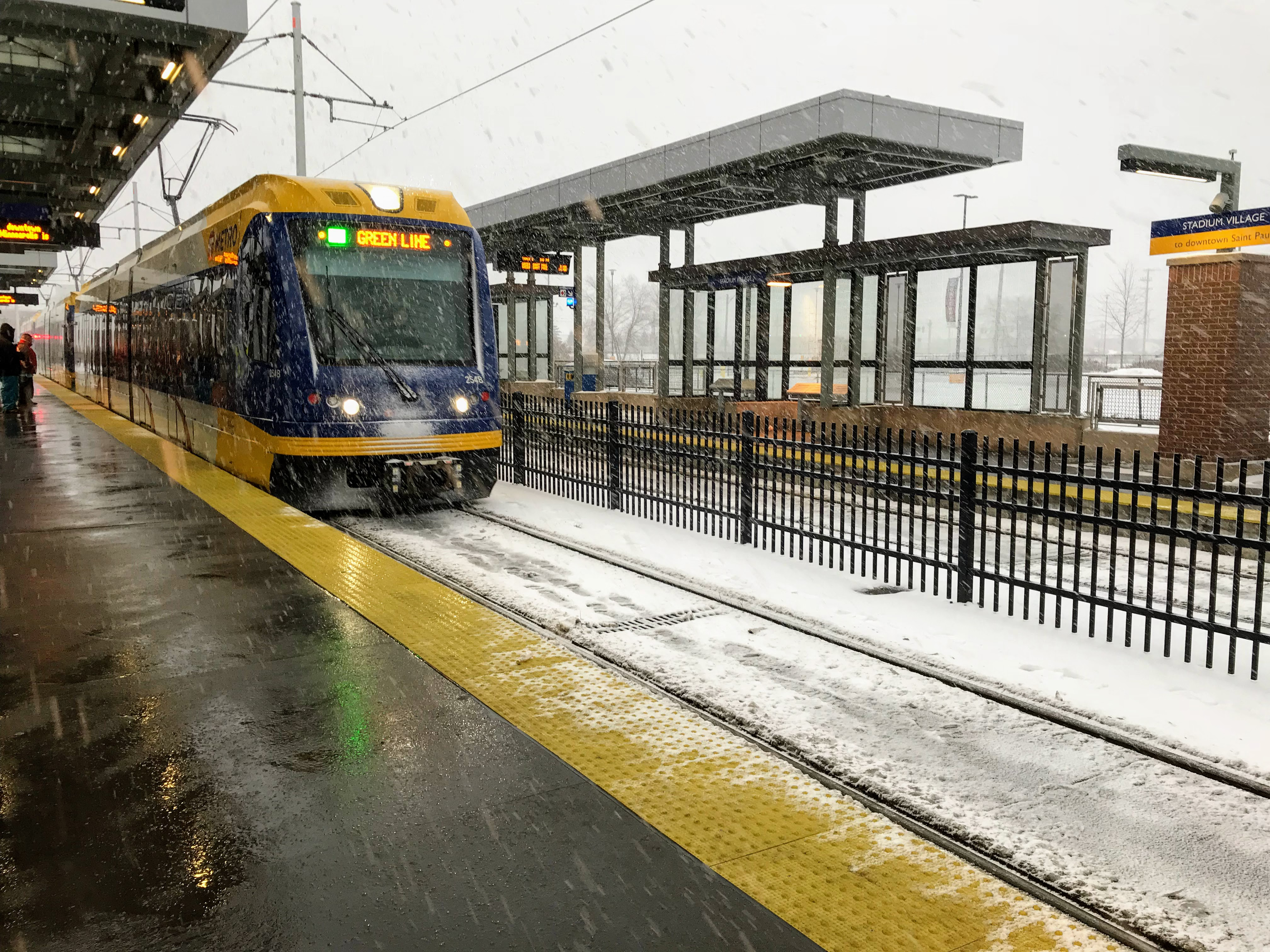
Stadium Village station in the snow.

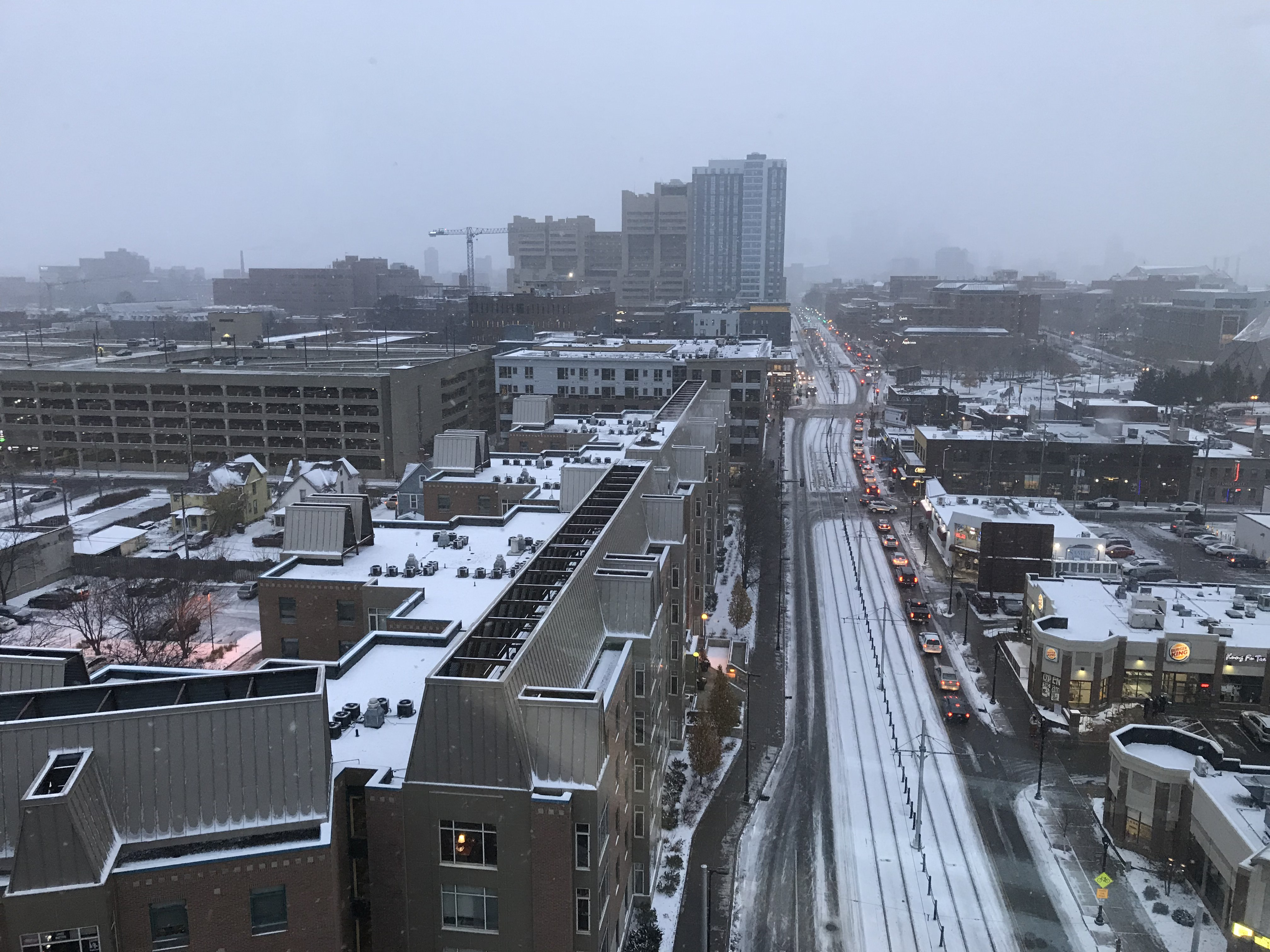
Looking west down Washington Ave

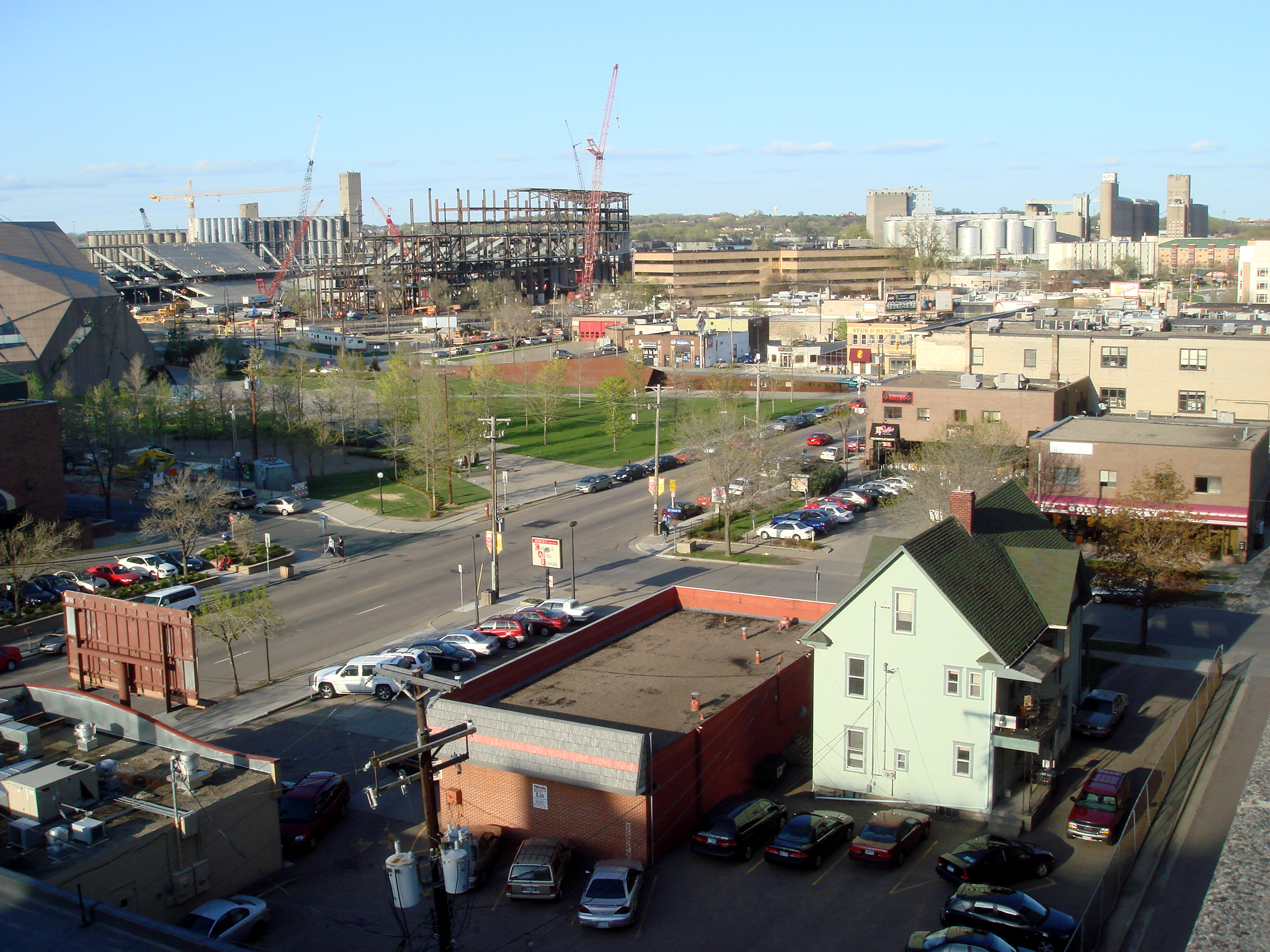
The neighborhood during the construction of the stadium

== See also ==
- Prospect Park, Minneapolis – nearby neighborhood
- University, Minneapolis – the University Community in Minneapolis
- Dinkytown, Minneapolis, Minnesota – Main campus commercial district
- Cedar-Riverside, Minneapolis – The West bank community near the University of Minnesota
- Student ghetto
- Stadium Village station – Light rail station nearby Huntington Bank stadium
