= Enterotoxemia =

Toxicity of the gastrointestinal tract

Enterotoxemia is a condition induced by the absorption of large volumes of toxins produced by bacteria such as Clostridium perfringens from the intestines. There are several strains of C. perfringens (type B, C, and D) that may lead to the development of this gastrointestinal condition.

== Lamb dysentery ==
A form of enterotoxemia caused by an infection of type B C. perfringens, affecting lambs who are less than three weeks old. Lambs often die before displaying clinical signs, nonetheless common behaviours of lambs with this condition include, cessation of nursing, lethargy, and recumbency. Diarrhea is typical as well, death usually occurs within a few days.

== Calf enterotoxemia ==
A form of enterotoxemia caused by type B or type C C. perfringens. Calves less than one month of age are affected. The symptoms include, diarrhea, abdominal discomfort, convulsions, and opisthotonos. Death may occur within a few days but recovery from this form is possible.

== Overeating disease or pulpy kidney ==
A form of enterotoxemia caused by type D C. perfringens that occurs in sheep and goats. When an animal is exposed to a rapid increase in dietary carbohydrates, the bacteria begin to proliferate, causing a significant rise in the concentration of toxins. Clinical signs include anorexia, abdominal pain, and liquid diarrhea (scours) that may contain blood.

== Edema disease ==
A form of enterotoxemia caused by specific pathotypes of Escherichia coli that occurs in nursery pigs.
