= Bovine coronavirus =

Virus classification
- (unranked): Virus
- Realm: Riboviria
- Kingdom: Orthornavirae
- Phylum: Pisuviricota
- Class: Pisoniviricetes
- Order: Nidovirales
- Family: Coronaviridae
- Genus: Betacoronavirus
- Subgenus: Embecovirus
- Species: Betacoronavirus gravedinis
- Virus: Bovine coronavirus

Strains
- Bovine coronavirus Mebus

Species of virus

Bovine coronavirus (BCV or BCoV) is a coronavirus which is a member of the species Betacoronavirus gravedinis. The infecting virus is an enveloped, positive-sense, single-stranded RNA virus which enters its host cell by binding to the N-acetyl-9-O-acetylneuraminic acid receptor. Infection causes calf enteritis and contributes to the enzootic pneumonia complex in calves. It can also cause winter dysentery in adult cattle. It can infect both domestic and wild ruminants and has a worldwide distribution. Transmission is horizontal, via oro-fecal or respiratory routes. Like other coronaviruses from genus Betacoronavirus, subgenus Embecovirus, it has a surface protein called hemagglutinin esterase (HE) in addition to the four structural proteins shared by all coronaviruses (spike, membrane, nucleocapsid, and envelope proteins).

== Virology ==
BCoV has 95% similarity with human coronavirus OC43 and 93% to porcine hemagglutinating encephalomyelitis virus. According to a 2006 study, those three strains may have diverged during the 19th century, while all circulating BCoV lineages had a most recent common ancestor around 1940s, with all earlier bovine lineages extinct.

An earlier article by the same authors compared BCoV and HCoV-OC43, and several methods yielded most probable divergence dates around 1890, leading authors to speculate that an introduction of the former strain to the human population might have caused the 1889–1890 flu pandemic.

== Clinical signs and diagnosis ==
Infection normally occurs in calves between the ages of one week and three months. Gastrointestinal signs include profuse diarrhea, dehydration, depression, reduced weight gain and anorexia. Respiratory infection in the calf produces a serous to purulent nasal discharge. Clinical signs may worsen with secondary bacteria infection.

Infection in adults is normally subclinical, the exception being with winter dysentery, which affects housed cattle over the winter months. Clinical signs include profuse diarrhea and a significant drop in milk yield is seen in winter dysentery outbreaks.

A presumptive diagnosis can be made based on the history and clinical signs. Definitive diagnosis of an enteric coronavirus infection is achieved by performing electron microscopy or an ELISA on a faecal or tissue sample. In respiratory disease, diagnosis is confirmed by performing a direct fluorescent antibody test on nasal washes – which identifies the viral antigen.

The haemagglutination inhibition test can be used to establish the strain of coronavirus.

== Treatment and control ==
Animals should be treated symptomatically. The disease can be controlled by vaccinating the dam with a live vaccine (ATCvet code QI02) whilst she is pregnant as this provides antibodies to the virus in the colostrum. Additional management factors such as ensuring adequate colostrum intake in newborn calves, using appropriate hygiene methods and ventilation of housing reduce disease incidence.
