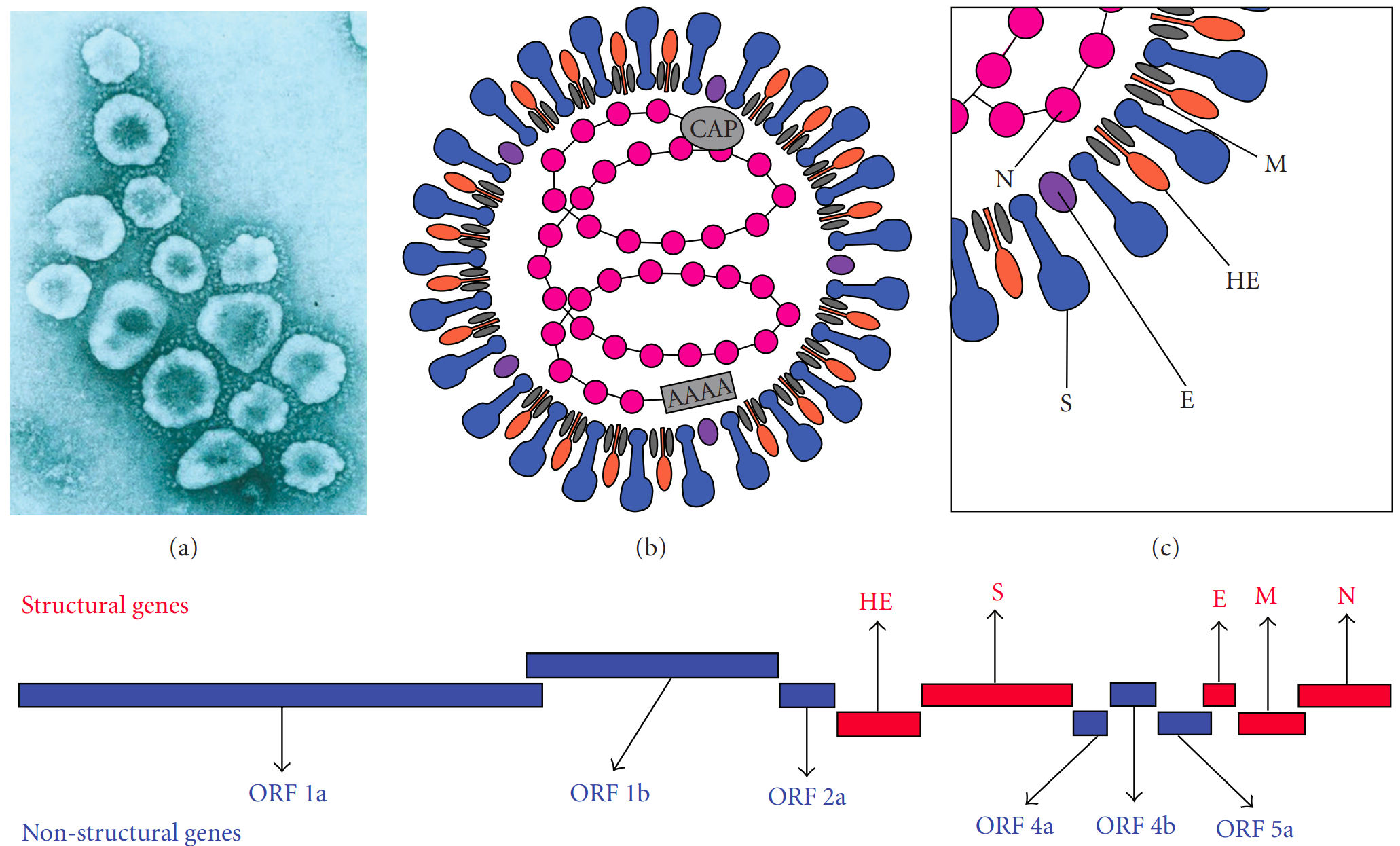
- Murine coronavirus (MHV) virion electron micrograph, schematic structure, and genome

Virus classification
- (unranked): Virus
- Realm: Riboviria
- Kingdom: Orthornavirae
- Phylum: Pisuviricota
- Class: Pisoniviricetes
- Order: Nidovirales
- Family: Coronaviridae
- Genus: Betacoronavirus
- Subgenus: Embecovirus
- Species: Betacoronavirus muris

Strains
- Mouse hepatitis virus (MHV), aka murine hepatitis virus; Puffinosis coronavirus; Rat coronavirus

= Murine coronavirus =

Species of virus

Murine coronavirus (M-CoV) is a virus in the genus Betacoronavirus that infects mice. Belonging to the subgenus Embecovirus, murine coronavirus strains are enterotropic or polytropic. Enterotropic strains include mouse hepatitis virus (MHV) strains D, Y, RI, and DVIM, whereas polytropic strains, such as JHM and A59, primarily cause hepatitis, enteritis, and encephalitis. Murine coronavirus is an important pathogen in the laboratory mouse and the laboratory rat. It is the most studied coronavirus in animals other than humans, and has been used as an animal disease model for many virological and clinical studies.

== Types ==
=== Murine hepatitis virus ===
Murine coronavirus was first discovered in 1949. The researchers isolated the virus from the brain, spinal cord, liver, lung, spleen, and kidney of a rat with symptoms of encephalitis and severe myelin injury, and gave it the strain name mouse hepatitis virus (MHV)-JHM. MHV is now the most studied coronavirus in animals other than humans, acting as a model organism for coronaviruses.

There are more than 25 different strains of murine coronavirus. Transmitted by the fecal–oral or respiratory route, these viruses infect the livers of mice and have been used as an animal disease model for hepatitis. Transmitted in fecal matter, the strains MHV-D, MHV-DVIM, MHV-Y and MHV-RI mainly infect the digestive tract, sometimes infecting the spleen, liver and lymphatic tissue. MHV-1, MHV-2, MHV-3, MHV-A59, MHV-S, MHV-JHM and other virus strains replicate in the respiratory tract and then spread to other organs such as the liver, lungs and brain. MHV-JHM mainly infects the central nervous system and has been widely studied since 1949. In rats, these nerve-infecting hepatitis viruses can cause acute or chronic neurological symptoms. Infection leads to demyelination, serving as an animal disease model of multiple sclerosis. MHV-2, MHV-3 and MHV-A59 can also infect the liver; the first two of these are more virulent. MHV-3 is the main virus strain used to study hepatitis; MHV-1 mainly infects the lungs.

Murine hepatitis virus is highly infectious and is one of the most common pathogens in laboratory mice. The symptoms of infection vary according to the type, path of infection, genotype and age of mouse. MHV-1, MHV-S and MHV-Y are weak viral strains; MHV-2, MHV-3, MHV-A5 9 and MHV-JHM are more virulent, being relatively mild in adult mice but having a high mortality in newborns. Infection, even if it does not cause obvious symptoms, may affect the immune system of laboratory subjects and cause errors in the interpretation of experimental results. For example, the virus can replicate in macrophages and affect their function, as well as in the spleen, where infection stimulates natural killer cells and affects T cell and B cells. There is no vaccine to prevent and treat hepatitis virus infection in mice, mainly because of the high mutation rate and the variety of virus strains, as well as concerns that vaccination may itself interfere with the interpretation of experimental research results, but this virus can be used as an experimental model for the development of other coronavirus vaccines.

In 1991, Michael M. C. Lai's laboratory completed the whole genome sequencing of the murine hepatitis virus. With a total length of 31,000 nucleotides, it was the largest RNA virus genome known at that time. In 2002, American virologist Ralph S. Baric developed a reverse genetic system for mouse hepatitis virus in which a complete MHV cDNA was assembled from smaller fragments.

=== Fancy rat coronavirus ===
In fancy rats, the rat coronavirus (RCoV or RCV) consists mainly of two virus strains, sialodacryoadenitis virus (SDAV) and Parker's RCoV (RCoV-P), both of which cause respiratory tract infections, with the former also affecting the eyes, Harderian gland, and salivary glands. In the past, it was believed that the symptoms caused by the two infections were different, but in recent years, it has been argued that the symptoms of both include eye and nasal discharge, large salivary gland enlargement, sialadenitis, photosensitivity, keratitis, shortness of breath, and pneumonia, among others. There is little to no obvious difference, and it has been suggested that Parker's rat coronavirus is only one type of rat salivary adenovirus. It is highly infectious. Generally, the symptoms in young rats are more serious, and some individuals suffer permanent eye damage.

=== Others ===
In 1982, researchers found a coronavirus in the brains of mice after isolation of puffinosis coronavirus (PCoV), which causes skin and eye disease in Manx shearwaters. The virus found was very similar to rat hepatitis virus, but due to the use of laboratory mice in the isolation process, the possibility cannot be excluded that it was derived from a mouse and not from the birds. Subsequent studies have shown that the virus has hemagglutinin esterase (HE). If the coronavirus did indeed originate from shearwater, it is one of few bird coronaviruses that is not a gammacoronavirus or deltacoronavirus. In 2009, the International Committee on Taxonomy of Viruses (ICTV) classified this bird coronavirus as belonging to the murine coronavirus clade.

From 2011 to 2013, researchers collected mouse samples at several locations in Zhejiang, China, and discovered three new virus strains in Longquan lesser ricefield rat, collectively described in 2015 as Longquan Rl rat coronavirus (LRLV).

== Genome ==
Rat coronavirus is a positive-stranded single-strand RNA virus with an outer membrane. It has a genome size of about 31,000 nucleotides. In addition to the four structural proteins of coronaviruses — spike protein (S), membrane protein (M), envelope protein (E) and nucleocapsid protein (N) — some mouse coronavirus surfaces also have hemagglutinin esterase (HE). HE can bind to sialic acid on the surface of the host cell and promote viral infection, and has acetyl esterase activity, which can degrade receptors to release the bound virus. The virus also has four auxiliary proteins — 2a, 4, 5a and I (or N2) (known as NS2, 15k, 12.6k and 7b in rat salivary adenophritis virus or as 2a, 5a, 5b and N2 in Longquan Luosai mouse coronavirus). These auxiliary proteins may counter the host's immune response. The auxiliary protein NS2 (encoded by the 2a gene) has 2′,5′-phosphodiesterase activity; it can degrade 2′,5′-oligoadenylate in the cell and avoid its activation. Ribonuclease L in cells activates the defense mechanism for degrading viral RNA and auxiliary protein 5a inhibits host interferon. The types of auxiliary proteins in different virus strains may differ. For example, MHV-S lacks auxiliary protein 5a, so it is less resistant to interferon. All four auxiliary proteins are dispensable for viral replication. The E protein is divided into the E1 and E2 glycoproteins, which are believed to serve different purposes. The genome is ordered 1ab-2a-HE-S-4-5a-E-M-N-I, where 5a and 5b proteins are encoded by the same mRNA and the open reading frame of I is located within the open reading frame of capsid protein N.

== Infection ==
When coronavirus infects the host cell, its spike protein (S) binds to the receptor on the surface of the host cell, which enables the virus to enter the cell. The spike protein is cut by the host's protease at all stages of the formation, transportation and infection of the new cell. The domain that helps the external membrane of the virus fuse with the cell membrane is exposed to facilitate infection. The host cell receptor used by rat coronavirus is generally CEACAM1 (mCEACAM1). The type of infected tissue and the time at which the spike protein is cut vary according to the virus strain. Among them is S1 in the spike protein of MHV-A59. The cleavage site of S2 is cut by proteases such as furin in the host cell when the virus is produced and assembled, and when the virus infects a new cell, further cleavage in the lysosomal pathway is also required for successful infection. The ocyrosin of MHV-2 does not have the S1/S2 cleavage site and is not cut during the assembly process. Its infection depends on cleavage of the spike protein by endosomal enzymes. MHV-JHM (especially the more virulent JHM.SD and JHM-cl2), which infects nerve tissue, can infect cells and achieve membrane fusion without binding to the cell receptor, so it can infect structures in the nervous system with little expression of mCEACAM1, and its infection may mainly depend on the cutting of its spike protein by the cell surface protease.

When rat hepatitis viruses of different strains infects cells at the same time, template switching can occur while genetic replication is carried out, resulting in gene recombination, which may be important for the evolution of viral diversity.

== Classification and evolution ==
Murine coronavirus is believed to be most closely related to human coronavirus HKU1. These two species, along with Betacoronavirus gravedinis, rabbit coronavirus HKU14, and China Rattus coronavirus HKU24, form subgenus Embecovirus within genus Betacoronavirus, according to the classification from the International Committee on Taxonomy of Viruses. This subgenus is distinguished by the presence of a gene encoding hemaglutinin esterase (HE), although in many laboratory murine hepatitis virus strains (such as MHV-A59 and MHV-1), this gene has been lost to mutation and persists only as a pseudogene. HE is dispensable for rat hepatitis virus infection and replication, and indeed, hepatitis strains lacking HE appear to have a competitive advantage in vitro.

The N-terminal domain (NTD) of the spike protein of coronavirus is similar to galectin in animal cells. Therefore, it has been suggested that this domain was originally derived from a host animal cell. Coronaviruses in this clade acquired HE to help the virus detach from sugars on infected cells, but later the NTD of the mouse coronavirus evolved into a new structure that can bind to the protein receptor mCEACAM1a. Using a protein receptor greatly increased the ability of the viruses to bind to murine cells. Because it was no longer necessary to bind to sugars, the lectin sugar-binding function was gradually lost, and eventually the HE gene was no longer expressed. In contrast, bovine coronavirus, human coronavirus OC43, and others are still sugar receptors, so the spike NTD retains the lectin function.

Alphacoronaviruses and betacoronaviruses may all originate from bat viruses, but the subgenus Embecovirus contains many viruses infecting rats (in addition to mouse coronavirus, there are also the Lucheng Rn rat coronavirus, China Rattus coronavirus HKU24 and Myodes coronavirus 2JL14, with a large number of related virus strains found since 2015), and no bat virus has been found. Some scholars suggest that the common ancestor of this clade may be a mouse virus, which was then transmitted by rats to humans and cattle.

== RNA–RNA recombination ==
Genetic recombination can occur when at least two RNA viral genomes are present in the same infected host cell. RNA–RNA recombination between different strains of the murine coronavirus was found to occur at a high frequency both in tissue culture and in the mouse central nervous system. These findings suggest that RNA–RNA recombination may play a significant role in the natural evolution and neuropathogenesis of coronaviruses. The mechanism of recombination appears to involve template switching during viral genome replication, a process referred to as copy choice recombination.

== Strains ==
Sialodacryoadenitis virus is a highly infectious coronavirus of laboratory rats that can be transmitted between individuals by direct contact and indirectly by aerosol. Acute infections have high morbidity and tropism for the salivary, lachrymal and Harderian glands.

Rabbit enteric coronavirus causes acute gastrointestinal disease and diarrhea in young European rabbits. Mortality rates are high.

== Research ==
Infection of mice with mouse hepatitis virus has been used as a model system to examine ivermectin as a treatment for coronaviruses.
