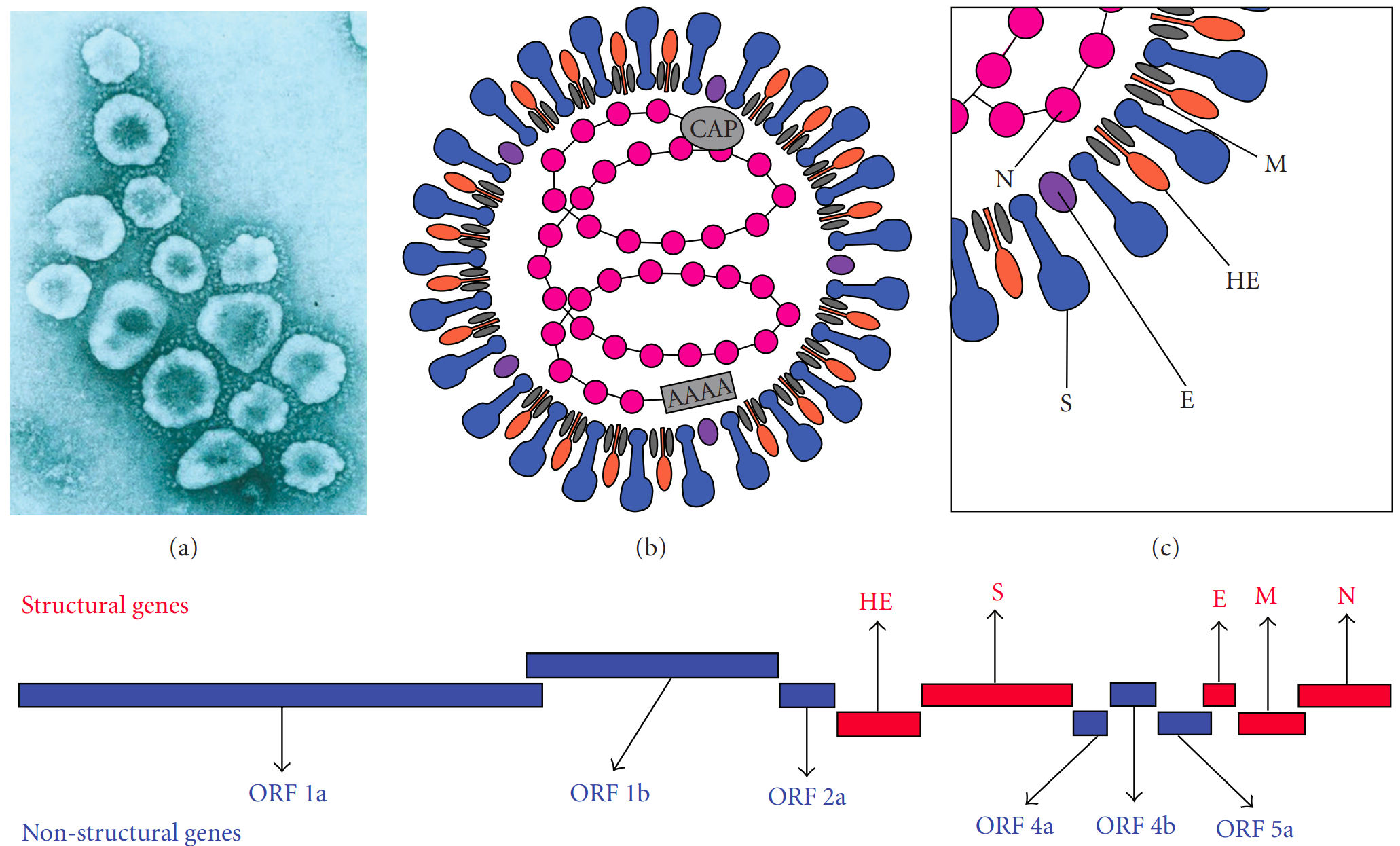
- Murine coronavirus (MHV) virion electron micrograph, schematic structure, and genome.

Virus classification
- (unranked): Virus
- Realm: Riboviria
- Kingdom: Orthornavirae
- Phylum: Pisuviricota
- Class: Pisoniviricetes
- Order: Nidovirales
- Family: Coronaviridae
- Genus: Betacoronavirus
- Subgenus: Embecovirus

= Embecovirus =

Subgenus of viruses

Embecovirus is a subgenus of coronaviruses in the genus Betacoronavirus. The viruses in this subgenus, unlike other coronaviruses, have a hemagglutinin esterase (HE) gene. The viruses in the subgenus were previously known as group 2a coronaviruses.

== Taxonomy ==
The subgenus contains the following species, listed by scientific name and followed by the exemplar virus of the species:

- Betacoronavirus gravedinis, Human coronavirus OC43
- Betacoronavirus hongkongense, Human coronavirus HKU1
- Betacoronavirus muris, Murine hepatitis virus
- Betacoronavirus myodae, Myodes rufocanus vole coronavirus 2/JL2014
- Betacoronavirus ratti, Betacoronavirus HKU24

== Structure ==
The viruses of this subgenus, like other coronaviruses, have a lipid bilayer envelope in which the membrane (M), envelope (E) and spike (S) structural proteins are anchored. Unlike other coronaviruses, viruses in this subgenus also have an additional shorter spike-like structural protein called hemagglutinin esterase (HE).

== Recombination ==
Genetic recombination can occur when two or more viral genomes are present in the same host cell. The dromedary camel beta-coronavirus (Beta-CoV HKU23) exhibits genetic diversity in the African camel population. Contributing to this diversity are several recombination events that had taken place in the past between closely related Beta-CoVs of the subgenus Embecovirus.

== See also ==
- Sarbecovirus (group 2b)
- Merbecovirus (group 2c)
- Nobecovirus (group 2d)
