= 1889–1890 pandemic =

Global pandemic

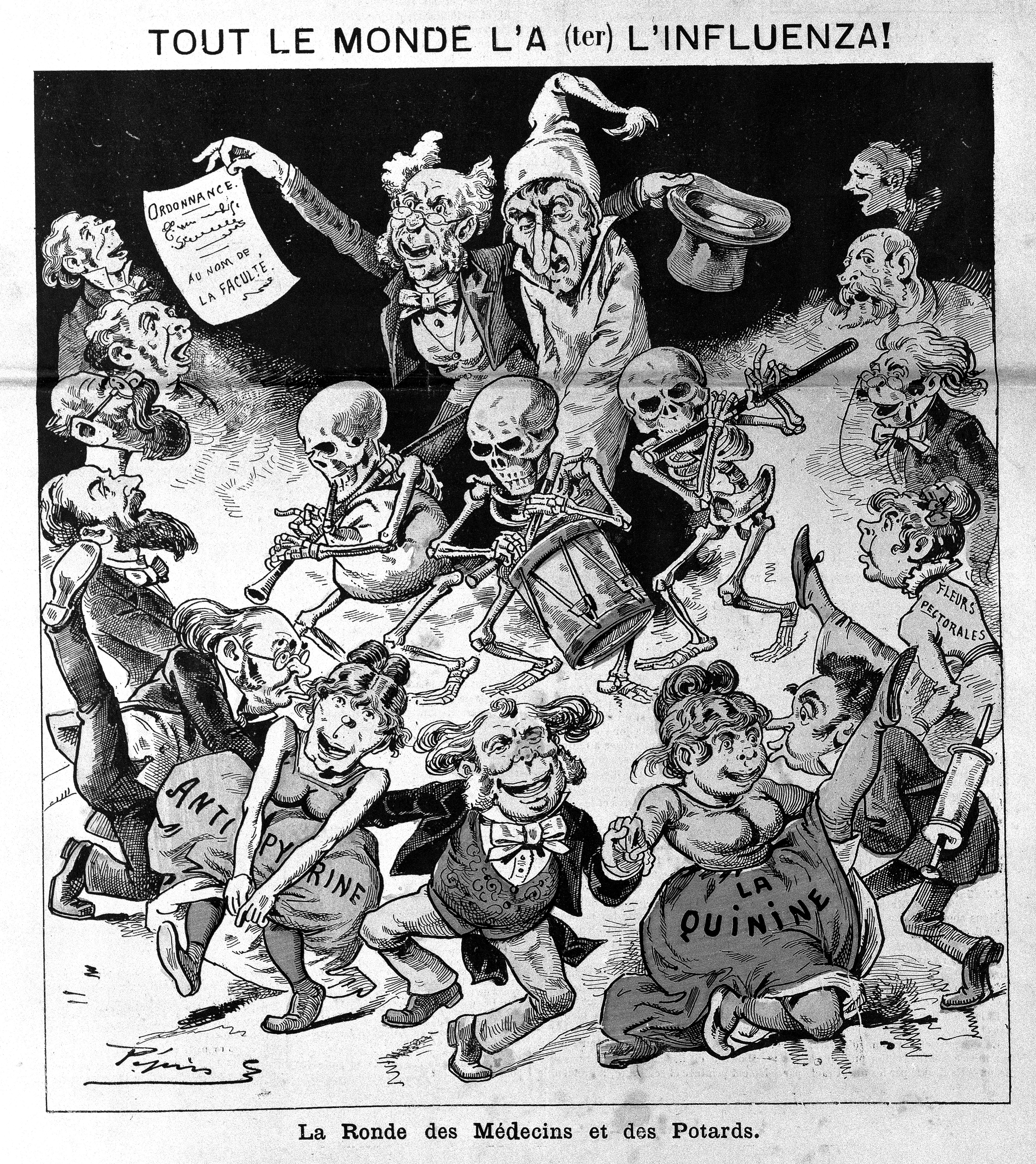
- The 12 January 1890 edition of the Paris satirical magazine Le Grelot depicted an unfortunate person with influenza bowled along by a parade of physicians, druggists, skeleton musicians, and dancing women representing quinine and antipyrine.
- Disease: Influenza or coronavirus disease (uncertain)
- Pathogen: A/H3N8, A/H2N2, or coronavirus OC43 (uncertain)
- Location: Worldwide
- First outbreak: Bukhara, Russian Empire
- Date: 1889–1890
- Suspected cases: 300–900 million (estimate)
- Deaths: 1 million (estimate)

The 1889–1890 pandemic, often referred to as the "Asiatic flu" or "Russian flu", was a worldwide respiratory viral pandemic. It was the last great pandemic of the 19th century, and is among the deadliest pandemics in history. The pandemic killed about 1 million people out of a world population of about 1.5 billion (0.067% of population). The most reported effects of the pandemic took place from October 1889 to December 1890, with recurrences in March to June 1891, November 1891 to June 1892, the northern winter of 1893–1894, and early 1895.

According to researchers' estimates, excess mortality from Russian influenza in the Russian Empire for the period 1889–1890 could be from 60,000 to 90,000 people, with lethality from the virus, a little more than 0.2%.

Although contemporaries described the pandemic as influenza and 20th-century scholars identified several influenza strains as the possible pathogen, several authors from the early 2020s suggest that it may have been caused by human coronavirus OC43.

== Outbreak and spread ==
Modern transport infrastructure assisted the spread of the 1889 pandemic. The 19 largest European countries, including the Russian Empire, had about 200,000 km of railroads, and transatlantic travel by sea took less than six days (not significantly different from current travel time by air, given the timescale of the global spread of a pandemic). It was the first pandemic to spread not just through a region such as Eurasia, but worldwide.

It is conventionally believed that the disease was first reported in May 1889 in the Central Asian city of Bukhara (modern Uzbekistan), then the capital of the Emirate of Bukhara, a protectorate of the Russian Empire. This goes back to publications of a local physician and follower of the miasma theory Oskar Heyfelder, who ignored the lack of catarrhal symptoms in the outbreak. Both a local independent commission of four doctors in August 1889 and historians in 2023 identified the infectious agent in Bukhara from May to August 1889 as not influenza, but malaria, which is endemic in the region, and the latter suggested an anomalously cold and snowy winter and anomalously high ground water levels as possible reasons for the severity of the outbreak.

Differences between the Bukhara epidemic and the Russian flu
Bukhara epidemic	Russian flu
Incubation period
1–2 weeks	1–3 days
Symptoms
High body temperature; loss of strength; reduction of body temperature ended with profuse sweating, no sweating at high temperature; enlargement of spleen and liver after the disease, anaemia. Absence of cough and respiratory system complications	High body temperature, collapse of strength, during the course of the disease the patient either sweated or did not sweat; cough; complications of the disease ended in bronchitis and pneumonia.
Lethality
5 % or more	0.2%

Most likely the first outbreak of Russian flu occurred in Western Siberia – Tomsk province. It was preceded by an epizootic of pneumonia in cattle.

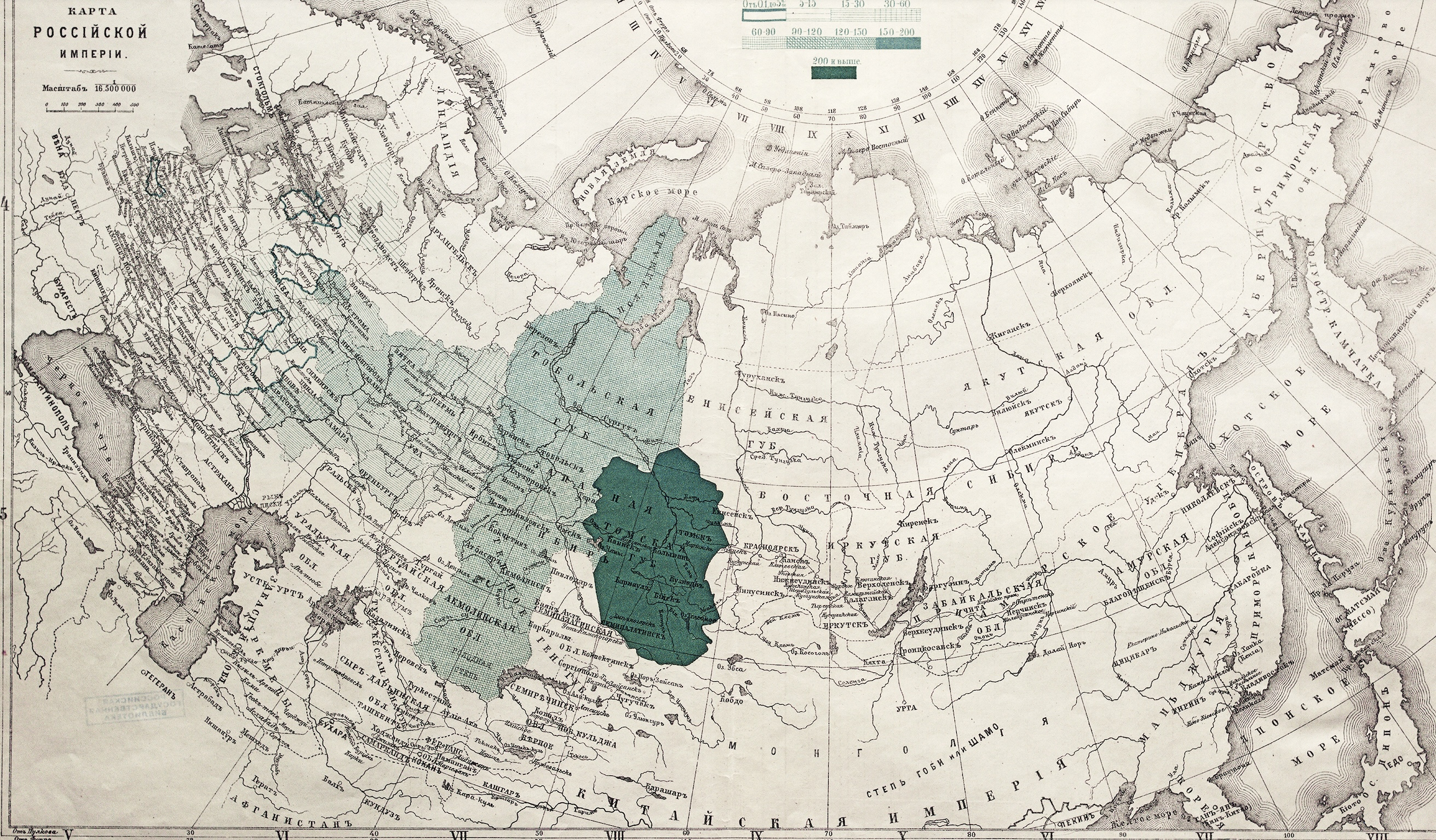
Spread of influenza within the Russian Empire in October 1889

It is also conventionally believed that the newly built Trans-Caspian railway enabled the disease to spread farther into Samarkand by August, and Tomsk, 3,200 km (2,000 mi) away, by October. However, the Russian military had not detected any flu in Samarkand in August, and, despite a significant military presence along the railway, the first flu cases were not diagnosed in the Turkestan Military District at all until late November.

Despite the fact that the Trans-Siberian Railway had not yet been constructed (which is often cited as the reason for slow transmission of the virus to European Russia), the anomalous rise in flu cases was detected in the military in the second half of October from multiple European cities all the way to 108th meridian east.

By November the pandemic had reached Saint Petersburg (infecting 180,000 of the city's under one million inhabitants) and Moscow. By mid-November Kyiv was infected, and the next month the Lake Baikal region was as well, followed by the rest of Siberia and Sakhalin by the end of the year.

From St. Petersburg, the infection spread via the Baltic shipping trade to Vaxholm in early November 1889, and then to Stockholm and the rest of Sweden, infecting 60% of the population within eight weeks. Norway, and then Denmark, followed soon after. The German Empire first received it in Posen in December, and on 12 November 600 workers were reported sick in Berlin and Spandau, with the cases in the city reaching 150,000 within a few days, and ultimately half of its 1.5 million inhabitants. Vienna was infected around the same time. Rome was reached by 17 December. The flu also arrived in Paris in December, and towards the end of the month had spread to Grenoble, Toulon, Toulouse and Lyon on the mainland, and Ajaccio on Corsica. At this point Spain was also infected, killing up to 300 a day in Madrid. It reached London at the same time, from where it spread quickly within Great Britain and Ireland to Birmingham, Glasgow, Edinburgh, and Dublin.

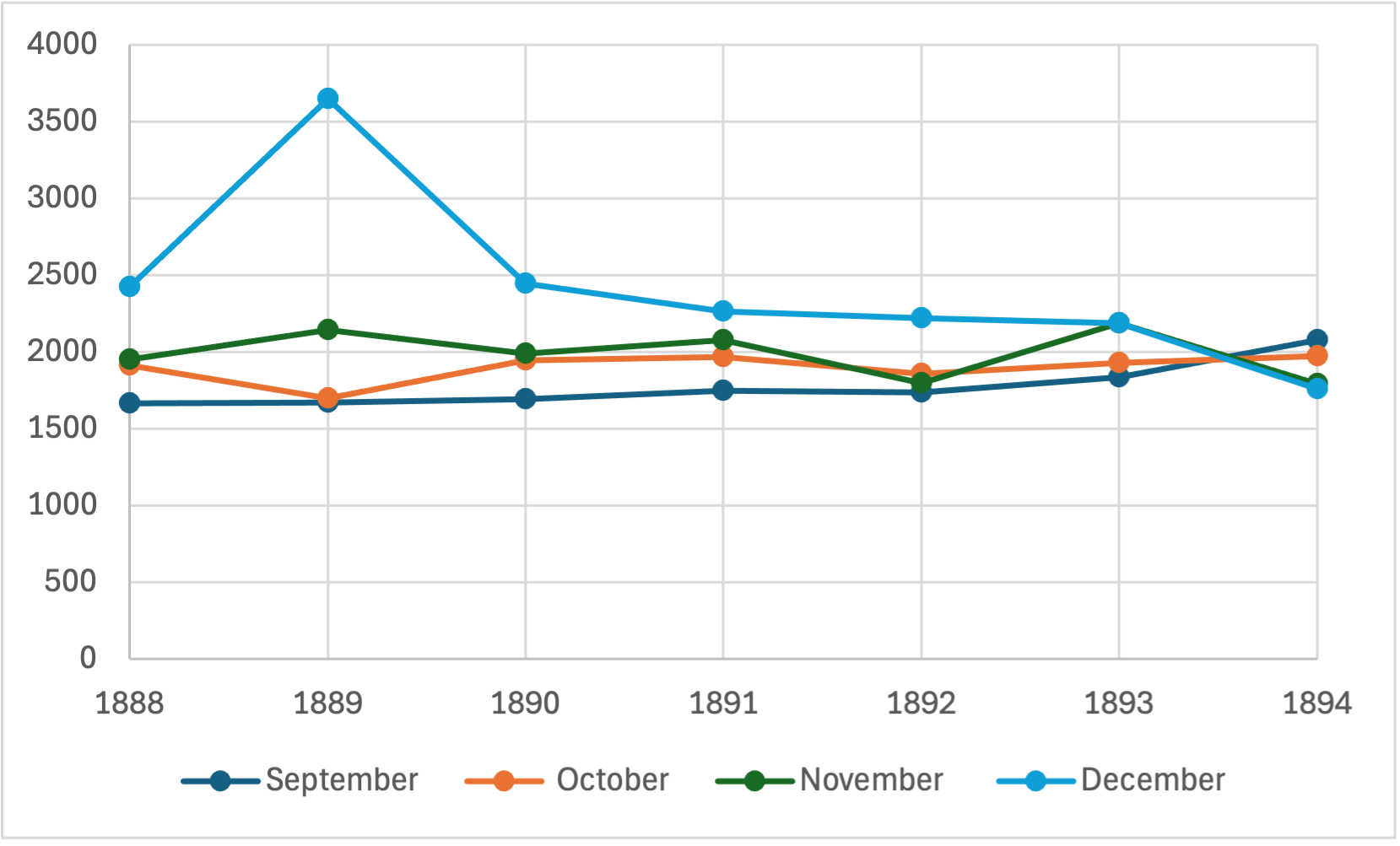
Monthly number of deaths in Livonia province in 1888-1894

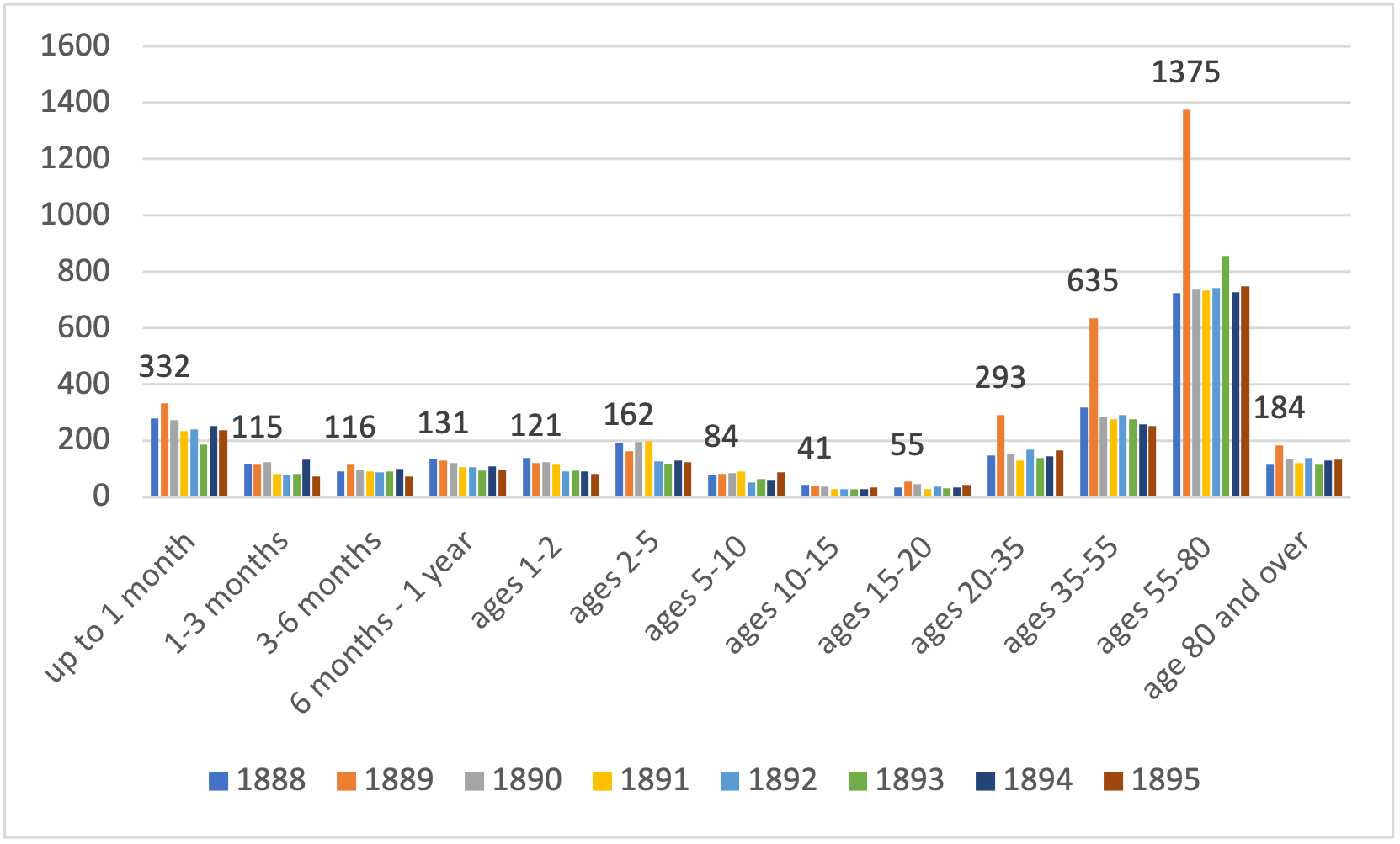
Number of deaths of different age groups in December in Livonia province from 1888 to 1895

The most satisfactory statistical data in the Russian Empire were observed in Livonia province. At the end of November 1889, the newspaper ‘Riga Herald’ reported: ‘Influenza has visited Riga - this is beyond any doubt. There are quite a lot of diseases, especially in places where many people are crowded together. By the way, the disease appeared in the non-commissioned officers' battalion.... Fortunately, the course of the disease is quite easy, but it is unpleasant in that it distracts the sick from classes’. Doctors - contemporaries of the epidemic - noted that after the peak of morbidity, pneumonia began to be observed, often leading to the death of the patient. ‘An accountant fell ill with Influenza, but paid no attention to it, and remained on his feet all the time; he died in three days with pneumonia. Yesterday they buried two ordinary workers, who also caught cold after Influenza and died on the fourth day’. Among the complications of the disease were prolonged weakness, adverse effects on cognitive ability, neuroses, otitis media, veins, lymphatic vessels and glands. Influenza affected members of all classes. From the middle of December 1889 the general morbidity of the population in the town began to decline, but the number of cases of pneumonia increased.The estimate of excess mortality in Livonia province in November 1889 showed an increase of 8 per cent in November 1889 and 67 per cent in December 1889, compared to the average for the seven-year period 1888–1895. The highest mortality was observed in the population over 35 years of age. Influenza also had an impact on fertility: the birth rate in September 1890 (conceived in December 1889) was the lowest for the period 1888 to 1895.

The first case on American soil was reported on 18 December 1889. It then quickly spread throughout the East Coast and all the way to Chicago and Kansas in days. The first American death, Thomas Smith of Canton, Massachusetts, was reported on 25 December. San Francisco and other cities were also reached before the month was over, with the total US death toll at about 13,000. From there it spread to Mexico and to South America, reaching Buenos Aires by 2 February.

India received it in February 1890, and Singapore and the Dutch East Indies (now Indonesia) did by March. These were followed by Japan, Australia, and New Zealand by April, and then China in May; the infection continued to spread, reaching its original starting point in Central Asia.

Cases in Africa began to appear in port cities in late December 1889 and in January 1890, although there may have been an early outbreak in Durban, South Africa, in November 1889.

In four months it had spread throughout the Northern Hemisphere. Deaths peaked in Saint Petersburg on 1 December 1889, and in the United States during the week of 12 January 1890. The median time between the first reported case and peak mortality was five weeks. In Malta, the Asiatic flu took hold between January 1889 and March 1890, with a fatality rate of 4% (39 deaths), and a resurgence in January to May 1892 with 66 fatalities (3.3% case fatality rate). When this flu began, it was debated whether it was in fact a human-to-human contagious disease; its virulence and rapid spread across all climates and terrains demonstrated that it was.

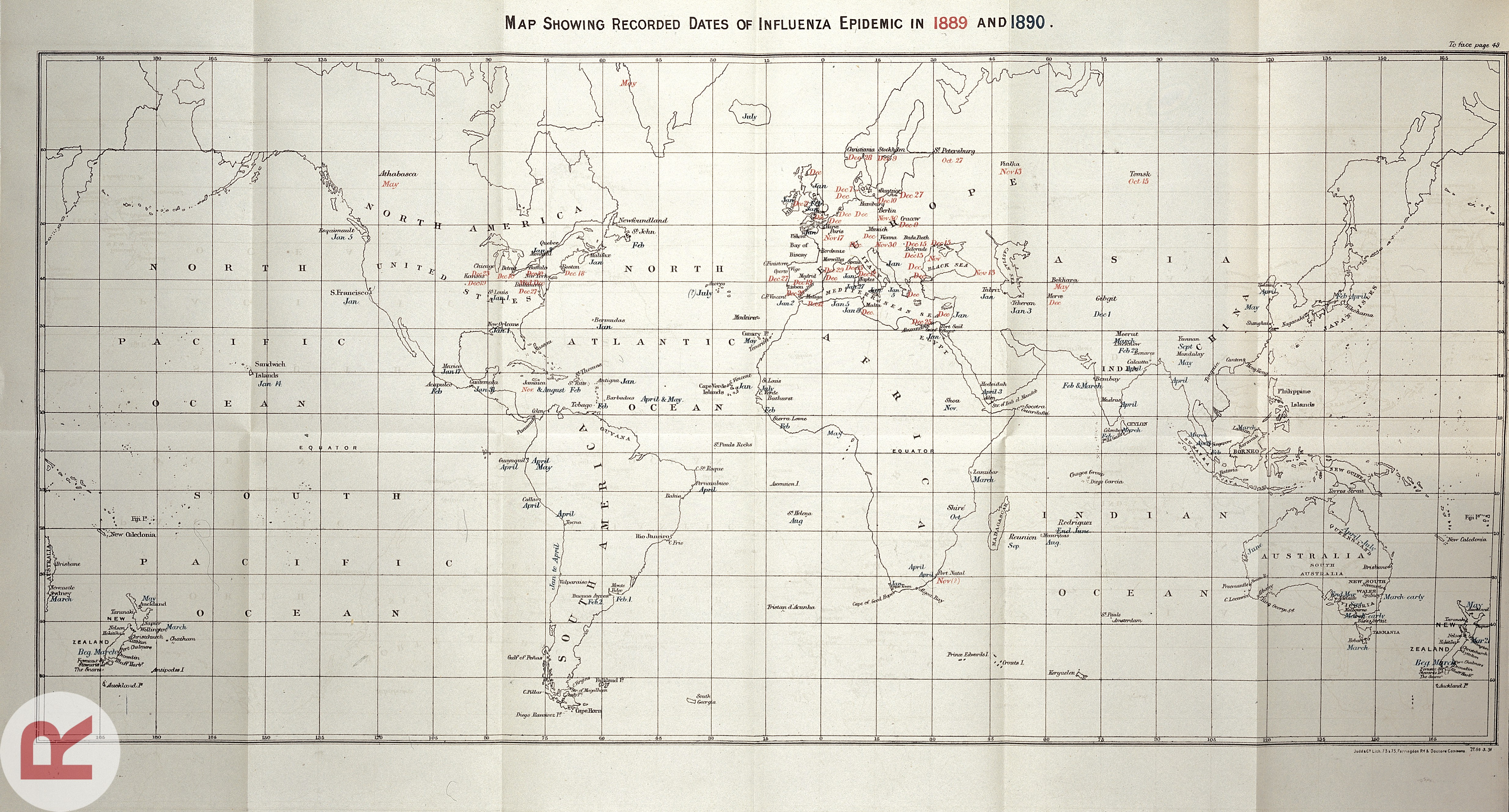
Recorded dates of the epidemic in 1889 and 1890

== Responses ==
=== Medical treatment ===
There was no standard treatment of flu: quinine and phenazone were used, as well as small doses of strychnine and larger ones of whisky and brandy, and as cheaper treatments linseed, salt and warm water, and glycerin. Many people also thought that fasting would 'starve' the fever, based on the belief that the body would not produce as much heat with less food; this was in fact poor medical advice. Furthermore, many doctors still believed in the miasma theory of disease rather than infectious spread: for example, notable professors of the University of Vienna, Hermann Nothnagel and Otto Kahler considered that the disease was not contagious.

=== Public health ===
US public health departments did little prevention in advance, even though they knew through transoceanic telegraph cable reports, that the Russian influenza was on its way.

A result of the Asiatic flu in Malta is that influenza became for the first time a compulsorily notifiable illness.

== Identification of virus responsible ==
=== Influenza virus ===
Researchers have tried for many years to identify the subtypes of Influenza A responsible for the 1889–1890, 1898–1900 and 1918 epidemics. Initially, this work was primarily based on "seroarcheology"—the detection of antibodies to influenza infection in the sera of elderly people—and it was thought that the 1889–1890 pandemic was caused by Influenza A subtype H2, the 1898–1900 epidemic by subtype H3, and the 1918 pandemic by subtype H1. With the confirmation of H1N1 as the cause of the 1918 flu pandemic following identification of H1N1 antibodies in exhumed corpses, reanalysis of seroarcheological data suggested Influenza A subtype H3 (possibly the H3N8 subtype) as a more likely cause for the 1889–1890 pandemic. This view is corroborated by converging seroarcheological and mortality data. In blood sera collected in 1956–1957, birth cohorts likely exposed early in life to the 1889–1890 pandemic had the highest percentages of detectable antibodies against the H3 strain that was later responsible for the 1968 pandemic. Correspondingly, excess mortality decreased sharply during that pandemic for these cohorts, who were 78 years old or older at the time.

=== Coronavirus ===
After the 2002–2004 SARS outbreak, virologists started sequencing human and animal coronaviruses. A comparison of two virus strains in the Betacoronavirus 1 species bovine coronavirus and human coronavirus OC43 indicated that the two had a most recent common ancestor in the late 19th century, with several methods yielding most probable dates around 1890. The authors speculated that an introduction of the former strain to the human population, rather than influenza, might have caused the 1889 epidemic. A Belgian team performed a similar analysis of OC43, identifying a crossover date in the late 1800s.

In 2021, during the COVID-19 pandemic, examination of contemporary medical reports noted that the pandemic's clinical manifestations resembled those of COVID-19 rather than influenza, with notable similarities including multisystem disease, loss of taste and smell perception, central nervous system symptoms and sequelae similar to long COVID. Other scientists have pointed to the fact the mortality curve for Russian Flu is J-shaped, as found in COVID-19, with little mortality in the very young and high mortality in the old, rather than the U-shaped mortality found in influenza infections, with high mortality in the very young and very old.

While a small sample of dental remains has been tested and lends weight to the hypothesis, there is still no scientific consensus that the 1889–1890 outbreak was caused by a coronavirus, with one analysis of the literature suggesting that the evidence for this causality is still "conjectural".

Before the first outbreak of Russian influenza, Tomsk province was experiencing an epizootic of pneumonia in cattle. Every year from June to November, up to 13,000 cattle, mostly from the Kulunda steppes, Barnaul district and Semipalatinsk region, were brought to Tomsk for slaughter. In autumn 1889, pneumonia was recorded among cattle in Tomsk. But despite the outbreak, the cattle were not isolated and moved freely through the streets of the city. Meat prices dropped to 1 ruble per pood. Because of the resulting disease, the inhabitants of the city either slaughtered the cattle or sold the animals very cheaply (a cow cost from 5 to 8 rubles). The inhabitants of Siberia hoped that with a drop in temperature the epizootic would subside. The newspapers wrote: "Siberians obediently waited for the onset of cold weather, with the appearance of which, however, the epizootic even more intensified, yes, in addition to it came and obnoxious Influenza. Notes on the relationship between influenza and animal diseases were found in the newspaper "Physician" 1889 г.: "...the connection of influenza with epizootics on horses, dogs and cats is undoubted; these epizootics have much in common with influenza...".These data are in favour of the theory that the "Russian influenza" of 1889 could have been caused by a coronavirus transmitted from cattle to humans.

== Patterns of mortality ==
Unlike most influenza pandemics such as the 1918 flu, primarily elderly people died in 1889. Due to generally lower standards of living, worse hygiene, and poorer standard of medicine, the proportion of vulnerable people was higher than in the modern world.

== Notable infections ==
=== Deaths ===
==== First outbreak ====
- 1 January 1890 Henry R. Pierson
- 7 January 1890 Augusta of Saxe-Weimar-Eisenach Dowager German Empress, Queen of Prussia
- 14 January 1890 Ignaz von Döllinger
- 15 January 1890 Walker Blaine
- 18 January 1890 Amadeo I of Spain
- 22 January 1890 Adam Forepaugh
- 22 February 1890 Bill Blair
- 12 March 1890 William Allen
- 26 March 1890 Afrikan Spir
- 23 May 1890 Louis Artan
- 19 July 1890 James P. Walker
- 14 August 1890 Michael J. McGivney

==== Recurrences ====
- 23 January 1891 Prince Baudouin of Belgium (Note: Baudouin's death was officially attributed to influenza, although many rumors attributed it to other causes.)
- 10 February 1891 Sofya Kovalevskaya
- 18 March 1891 William Herndon
- 22 April 1891 John Ballou Newbrough
- 5 May 1891 William Connor Magee
- 8 May 1891 Helena Blavatsky
- 15 May 1891 Edwin Long
- 3 June 1891 Oliver St John
- 9 June 1891 Henry Gawen Sutton
- 1 July 1891 Frederic Edward Manby
- 20 December 1891 Grisell Baillie
- 28 December 1891 William Arthur White
- 7 January 1892 Tewfik Pasha
- 8 January 1892 John Tay
- 10 January 1892 John George Knight
- 12 January 1892 Jean Louis Armand de Quatrefages de Bréau
- 14 January 1892 Prince Albert Victor, Duke of Clarence and Avondale, grandson of Queen Victoria and second-in-line to the British throne
- 17 January 1892 Charles A. Spring
- 20 January 1892 Douglas Hamilton
- 12 February 1892 Thomas Sterry Hunt
- 9 March 1892 Sereno Watson
- 15 April 1892 Amelia Edwards
- 5 May 1892 Gustavus Cheyney Doane
- 24 May 1892 Charles Arthur Broadwater
- 10 June 1892 Charles Fenerty
- 21 April 1893 Edward Stanley, 15th Earl of Derby
- 2 July 1893 Georgie Drew Barrymore
- 7 August 1893 Thomas Burges
- 31 August 1893 William Cusins
- 15 December 1893 Samuel Laycock
- 16 December 1893 Tom Edwards-Moss
- 3 January 1894 Hungerford Crewe, 3rd Baron Crewe
- 24 January 1894 Constance Fenimore Woolson (Note: Woolson fell from the window of her room while likely under the influence of laudanum, which she may have been taking to relieve symptoms of influenza.)
- 24 January 1894 Laura Schirmer Mapleson
- 14 March 1894 John T. Ford
- 19 June 1894 William Mycroft
- 19 February 1895 John Hulke
- 1 March 1895 Frederic Chapman
- 2 March 1895 Berthe Morisot
- 5 March 1895 Sir Henry Rawlinson, 1st Baronet
- 20 March 1895 James Sime
- 24 March 1895 John L. O'Sullivan
- 2 August 1895 Joseph Thomson

=== Survivors ===
- Alexander III of Russia
- Alfonso XIII of Spain
- Srinivasa Ramanujan
- John Thomas Banks
- Marie François Sadi Carnot
- Charles I of Württemberg
- Albert Edward, Prince of Wales (later Edward VII)
- Empress Elisabeth of Austria
- Archduke Ernst of Austria
- William Ewart Gladstone
- Maurice de Hirsch
- Johanna von Puttkamer
- Archduke Karl Ludwig of Austria
- Pope Leo XIII
- Empress Maria Feodorovna of Russia
- Archduchess Marie Valerie of Austria
- Olga Nikolaevna of Russia
- Oscar I of Sweden
- Pierre Tirard
- Robert Gascoyne-Cecil, 3rd Marquess of Salisbury
- Edward Villiers, 5th Earl of Clarendon

== See also ==
- Carlill v Carbolic Smoke Ball Co – case in English contract law, concerning an advertisement of 1891 for a putative flu remedy
- Spanish flu
- Hong Kong flu
- 2009 swine flu pandemic
- COVID-19 pandemic
