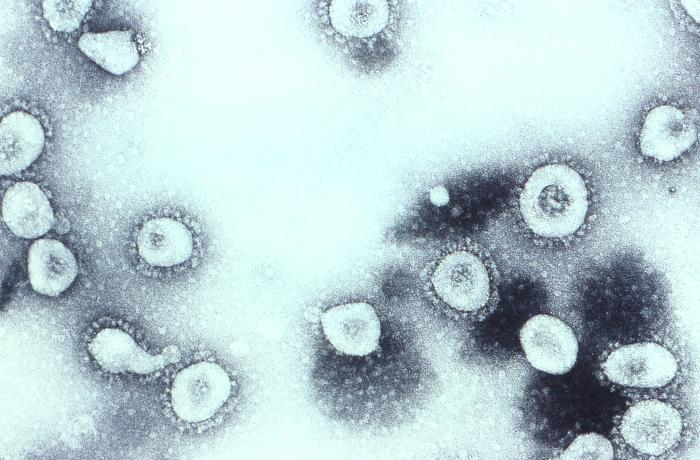
- Transmission electron micrograph of human coronavirus OC43

Virus classification
- (unranked): Virus
- Realm: Riboviria
- Kingdom: Orthornavirae
- Phylum: Pisuviricota
- Class: Pisoniviricetes
- Order: Nidovirales
- Family: Coronaviridae
- Genus: Betacoronavirus
- Subgenus: Embecovirus
- Species: Betacoronavirus gravedinis

Member viruses
- Bovine coronavirus; Bovine coronavirus Mebus; Equine coronavirus; Equine coronavirus NC99; Human coronavirus OC43; Human coronavirus OC43 ATCC VR-759; Porcine hemagglutinating encephalomyelitis virus; Porcine hemagglutinating encephalomyelitis virus VW572

Synonyms
- Betacoronavirus 1; Bovine coronavirus; canine respiratory coronavirus; Equine coronavirus; Human coronavirus OC43; Human enteric coronavirus; Porcine hemagglutinating encephalitis virus; Porcine hemagglutinating encephalomyelitis virus

= Betacoronavirus 1 =

Betacoronavirus gravedinis

Species of virus

Betacoronavirus gravedinis (also called Betacoronavirus 1) is a species of coronavirus which infects humans and cattle. The infecting virus is an enveloped, positive-sense, single-stranded RNA virus and is a member of the genus Betacoronavirus and subgenus Embecovirus. Like other embecoviruses, it has an additional shorter spike-like surface protein called hemagglutinin esterase (HE) as well as the larger coronavirus spike protein.
