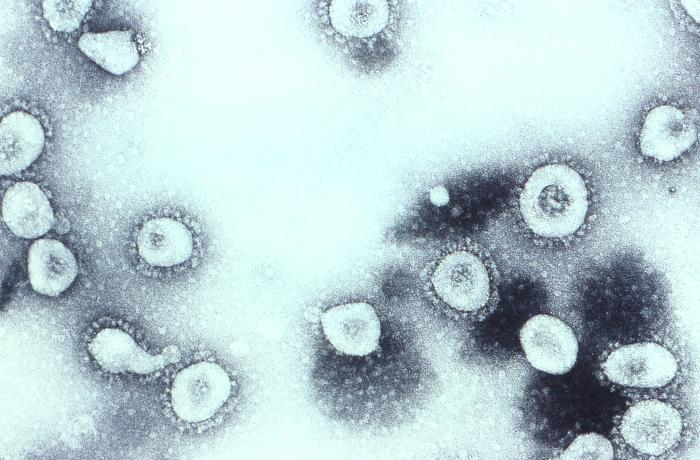
- Transmission electron micrograph of human coronavirus OC43

Virus classification
- (unranked): Virus
- Realm: Riboviria
- Kingdom: Orthornavirae
- Phylum: Pisuviricota
- Class: Pisoniviricetes
- Order: Nidovirales
- Family: Coronaviridae
- Genus: Betacoronavirus
- Subgenus: Embecovirus
- Species: Betacoronavirus gravedinis
- Virus: Human coronavirus OC43

= Human coronavirus OC43 =

Species of virus

Human coronavirus OC43 (HCoV-OC43) is a member of the species Betacoronavirus gravedinis, which infects humans and cattle. The infecting coronavirus is an enveloped, positive-sense, single-stranded RNA virus that enters its host cell by binding to the N-acetyl-9-O-acetylneuraminic acid receptor. OC43 is one of seven coronaviruses known to infect humans. It is one of the viruses responsible for the common cold and may have been responsible for the 1889–1890 pandemic. It has, like other coronaviruses from genus Betacoronavirus, subgenus Embecovirus, an additional shorter spike protein called hemagglutinin-esterase (HE). Genetic and antigenic analyses reveal significant similarities between HCoV-OC43 and bovine coronavirus (BCoV), suggesting a zoonotic transmission event from cattle to humans. Molecular analyses estimate that this cross-species transmission occurred sometime in the late 19th century, possibly around 1890. This period aligns with the "Russian Influenza" pandemic that occurred from 1889 -1892. This has led some researchers to theorize that HCoV-OC43 may have been the causative agent of that pandemic, rather than the influenza virus. This theory is further supported by phylogenetic studies indicating a recent common ancestor between HCoV-OC43 and BCoV around that time.

== Virology ==
Four HCoV-OC43 genotypes (A to D) have been identified, with genotype D most likely arising from genetic recombination. The complete genome sequencing of genotypes C and D and bootscan analysis shows recombination events between genotypes B and C in the generation of genotype D. Of 29 viral variants identified, none belong to the more ancient genotype A. Molecular clock analysis using spike and nucleocapsid genes dates the most recent common ancestor of all genotypes to the 1950s. Genotype B and C date to the 1980s. Genotype B to the 1990s, and genotype C to the late 1990s to early 2000s. The recombinant genotype D variants were detected as early as 2004. The genome is made of approximately 30,700 nucleotides and encodes for several structural proteins:

- Spike (S) Protein: Facilitates viral entry into host cells by binding to receptors.
- Hemagglutinin-Esterase (HE) Protein: An additional shorter spike protein characteristic of embecoviruses, which binds to N-acetyl-9-O-acetylneuraminic acid receptors on host cells.
- Membrane (M) Protein: Plays a role in viral assembly and budding.
- Envelope (E) Protein: Involved in virus morphogenesis and release.
- Nucleocapsid (N) Protein: Encapsidates the viral RNA genome, forming the nucleocapsid structure.

Comparison of HCoV-OC43 with the most closely related strain of Betacoronavirus 1 species, bovine coronavirus BCoV, indicated that they had a most recent common ancestor in the late 19th century, with several methods yielding most probable dates around 1890, leading authors to speculate that an introduction of the former strain to the human population might have caused the 1889–1890 pandemic, which at the time was attributed to influenza. The COVID-19 pandemic brought further evidence of a link, as the 1889–1890 pandemic produced symptoms closer to those associated with COVID-19 (the infection caused by the SARS-CoV-2 betacoronavirus) than to influenza. Brüssow, in August 2021, referred to the evidence that OC43 caused the 1889–1890 outbreak as "indirect, albeit weak" and was "conjectural", yet the 1889 epidemic was the best historical record to make predictions about the current COVID-19 path due to the similar "clinical and epidemiological characteristics".

The origin of HCoV-OC43 is uncertain, but it is thought that it may have originated in rodents, then passed through cattle as intermediate hosts. A deletion from BCoV to HCoV-OC43 may have taken place for the interspecies transmission event from bovines to humans.

== Signs and symptoms ==
Human coronavirus OC43 (HCoV-OC43) is commonly associated with mild upper respiratory tract infections, presenting symptoms such as nasal congestion, sore throat, cough, and fever. Certain populations, particularly infants, the elderly and immunocompromised individuals, may experience more severe lower respiratory tract infections, including bronchitis and pneumonia.

A summary of the signs and symptoms include:

- Nasal Congestion: A blocked or runny nose is a frequent symptom.
- Sore Throat: Discomfort or irritation in the throat often accompanies the infection.
- Cough: A persistent cough is commonly observed.
- Fever: Elevated body temperature may occur in some cases.
- Headache: Some individuals report headaches during the course of the infection.

While primarily targeting the respiratory system, HCoV-OC43 has also been implicated in rare cases of central nervous system involvement. There have been reports linking HCoV-OC43 to fatal encephalitis in infants with underlying health conditions. Outbreaks of HCoV-OC43 have occurred in long-term care facilities during the COVID-19 pandemic. Clinical features of those affected were described similar to those of COVID infection.

== Pathogenesis ==
Along with HCoV-229E, a species in the genus Alphacoronavirus, HCoV-OC43 is among the viruses that cause the common cold. Both viruses can cause severe lower respiratory tract infections, including pneumonia, in infants, the elderly, and immunocompromised individuals such as those undergoing chemotherapy and those with HIV/AIDS. Rare cases with central nervous system involvement have been reported, usually manifesting as viral encephalitis.

=== Viral Entry and Replication ===
HCoV-OC43 facilitates entry by attaching to host cell receptors through spike (S) proteins. Once inside the cell, the virus releases positive-sense single-stranded RNA genome, which is translated and replicated using the host's cellular machinery. Recent studies have employed ribosome profiling and RNA sequencing to analyze the transcriptional and translational landscape of HCoV-OC43 infection. This has uncovered unexpected features in the viral genome, including short open reading frames upstream of major genes and an alternative translation start site within the M gene.

==== Host Immune Response ====
Once infected, the host cells mount an immune response to counteract the effect of the virus. HCoV-OC43 infection has been shown to remodel gap junction-mediated intercellular communication, specifically affecting Connexin 43 (Cx43), which may influence the spread of the virus and the host's immune response. Envelope (E) proteins play a key role in viral assembly, morphogenesis and pathogenesis. Protein-protein interactions and homo-oligomeric ion channel formation through E protein interactions are essential for virion morphology and the host cell's response to infection.

== Epidemiology ==
Coronaviruses have a worldwide distribution, causing 10–15% of common cold cases (the virus most commonly implicated in the common cold is a rhinovirus, found in 30–50% of cases). Infections show a seasonal pattern with most cases occurring in the winter months in temperate climates, and summer and spring in warm climates. As OC43 is capable of infecting porcine tissues, it is likely that pigs serve as a zoonotic reservoir for this disease, reinfecting the human population.

== See also ==
- Human coronavirus HKU1
