= Myodes coronavirus 2JL14 =

Virus classification
- (unranked): Virus
- Realm: Riboviria
- Kingdom: Orthornavirae
- Phylum: Pisuviricota
- Class: Pisoniviricetes
- Order: Nidovirales
- Family: Coronaviridae
- Genus: Betacoronavirus
- Subgenus: Embecovirus
- Species: Betacoronavirus myodae

Species of virus

Myodes coronavirus 2JL14 (Betacoronavirus myodae) is a species of coronavirus in the genus Betacoronavirus.
