= Coronavirus spike protein =

Glycoprotein spike on a viral capsid or viral envelope

Coronavirus spike glycoprotein
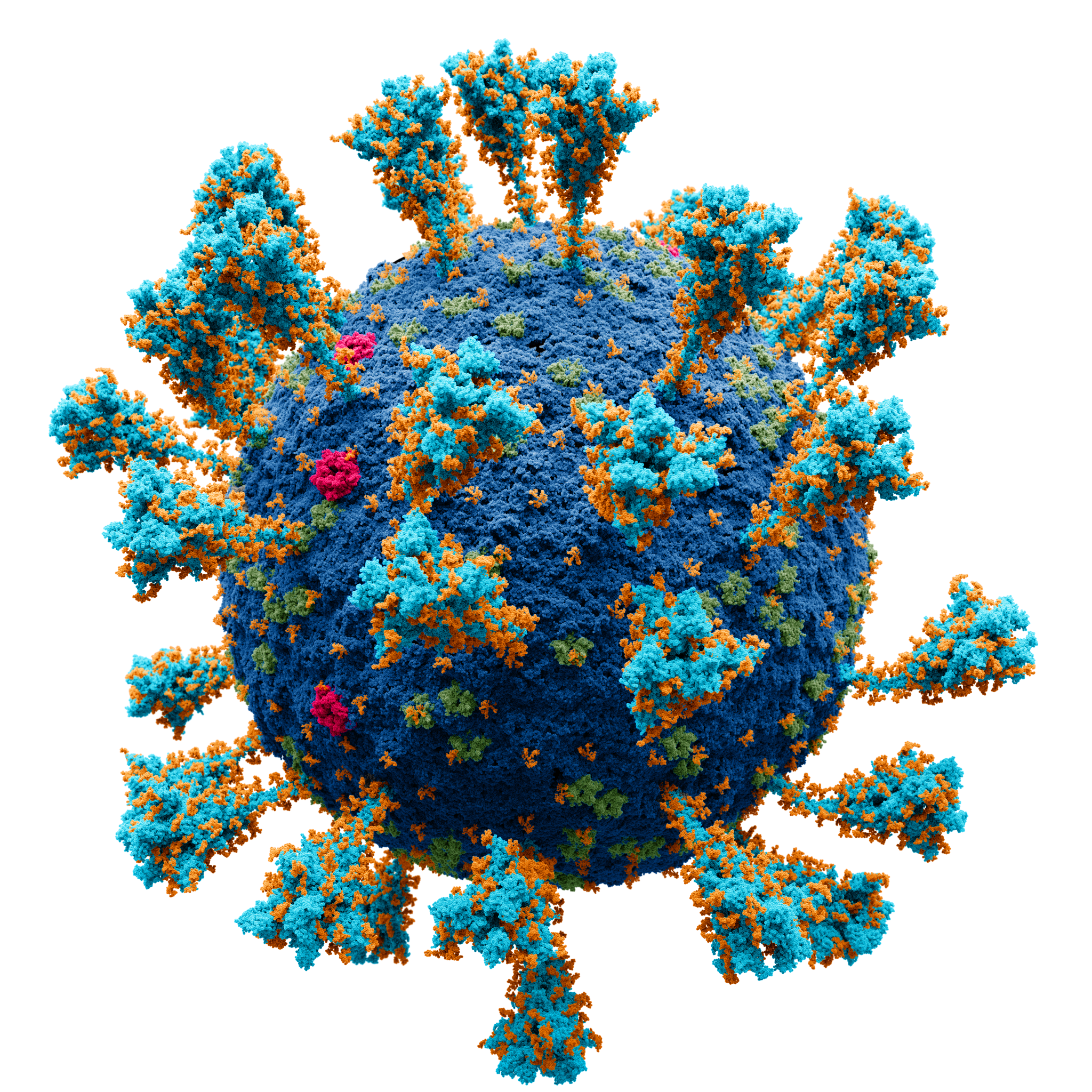
- Model of the external structure of the SARS-CoV-2 virion. ● Blue: envelope ● Turquoise: spike glycoprotein (S) ● Red: envelope proteins (E) ● Green: membrane proteins (M) ● Orange: glycan

Identifiers
- Symbol: CoV_S1
- Pfam: PF01600
- InterPro: IPR002551
Available protein structures:
- PDB: IPR002551 PF01600 (ECOD; PDBsum)
- AlphaFold: IPR002551; PF01600

Spike (S) glycoprotein (sometimes also called spike protein, formerly known as E2) is the largest of the four major structural proteins found in coronaviruses. The spike protein assembles into trimers that form large structures, called spikes or peplomers, that project from the surface of the virion. The distinctive appearance of these spikes when visualized using negative stain transmission electron microscopy, "recalling the solar corona", gives the virus family its main name.

The function of the spike glycoprotein is to mediate viral entry into the host cell by first interacting with molecules on the exterior cell surface and then fusing the viral and cellular membranes. Spike glycoprotein is a class I fusion protein that contains two regions, known as S1 and S2, responsible for these two functions. The S1 region contains the receptor-binding domain that binds to receptors on the cell surface. Coronaviruses use a very diverse range of receptors; HCoV-NL63, SARS-CoV (which causes SARS) and SARS-CoV-2 (which causes COVID-19) all interact with angiotensin-converting enzyme 2 (ACE2). The S2 region contains the fusion peptide and other fusion infrastructure necessary for membrane fusion with the host cell, a required step for infection and viral replication. Spike glycoprotein determines the virus' host range (which organisms it can infect) and cell tropism (which cells or tissues it can infect within an organism).

Spike glycoprotein is highly immunogenic. Antibodies against spike glycoprotein are found in patients recovered from SARS and COVID-19. Neutralizing antibodies target epitopes on the receptor-binding domain. Most COVID-19 vaccine development efforts in response to the COVID-19 pandemic aim to activate the immune system against the spike protein.

== Structure ==
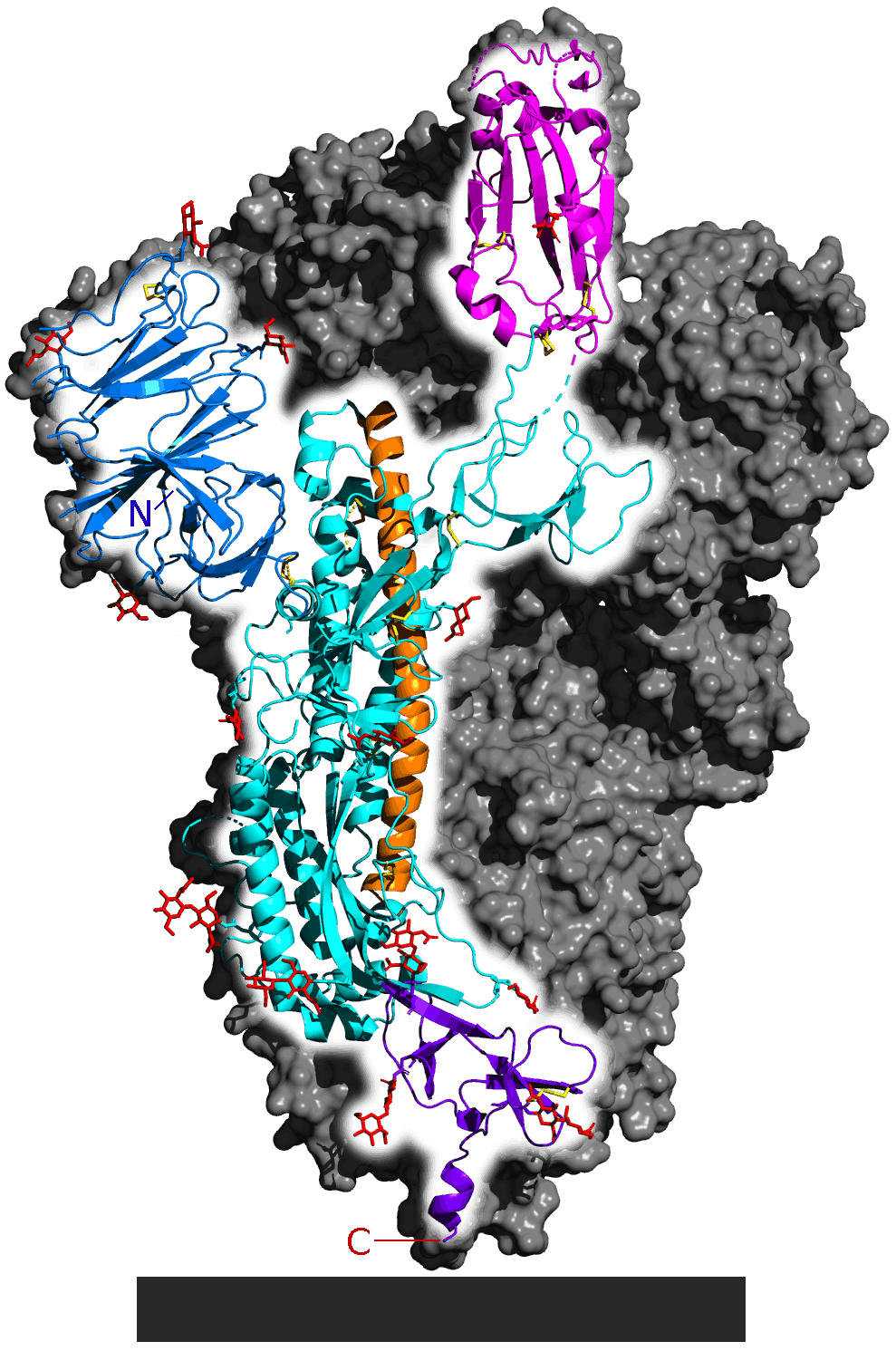
Spike glycoprotein from SARS-CoV-2. PDB: 6VSB. Only one monomer is highlighted. Whole protein is a homotrimer. Rest of the trimer is shown as a gray surface. Parts of the actual structure are not shown. The following are listed from N-terminal (letter N) to C-terminal (C): N-terminal domain (blue), ACE2 receptor binding domain (magenta) general structure (cyan), central helix (orange, faces inside of the homotrimer) and connector domain (purple, anchors the spike protein to virus lipid envelope). Yellow: disulfide bonds. Red: carbohydrates. Gray block: lipid membrane of the virus.

The spike protein is very large, often 1200 to 1400 amino acid residues long; it is 1273 residues in SARS-CoV-2. It is a single-pass transmembrane protein with a short C-terminal tail on the interior of the virus, a transmembrane helix, and a large N-terminal ectodomain exposed on the virus exterior.

Spike glycoprotein forms homotrimers in which three copies of the protein interact through their ectodomains. The trimer structures have been described as club- pear-, or petal-shaped. Each spike protein contains two regions known as S1 and S2, and in the assembled trimer the S1 regions at the N-terminal end form the portion of the protein furthest from the viral surface while the S2 regions form a flexible "stalk" containing most of the protein-protein interactions that hold the trimer in place. Both the S1 and S2 regions are involved in ACE2 receptor binding and fusion between the viral envelope and the host cell membrane.

=== S1 ===
Betacoronavirus spike glycoprotein S1, receptor binding

Identifiers
- Symbol: bCoV_S1_RBD
- Pfam: PF09408
- InterPro: IPR018548
Available protein structures:
- PDB: IPR018548 PF09408 (ECOD; PDBsum)
- AlphaFold: IPR018548; PF09408

Betacoronavirus-like spike glycoprotein S1, N-terminal

Identifiers
- Symbol: bCoV_S1_N
- Pfam: PF16451
- InterPro: IPR032500
Available protein structures:
- PDB: IPR032500 PF16451 (ECOD; PDBsum)
- AlphaFold: IPR032500; PF16451

The S1 region of the spike glycoprotein is responsible for interacting with receptor molecules on the surface of the host cell in the first step of viral entry. S1 contains two domains, called the N-terminal domain (NTD) and C-terminal domain (CTD), sometimes also known as the A and B domains. Depending on the coronavirus, either or both domains may be used as receptor-binding domains (RBD). Target receptors can be very diverse, including cell surface receptor proteins and sugars such as sialic acids as receptors or coreceptors. In general, the NTD binds sugar molecules while the CTD binds proteins, with the exception of mouse hepatitis virus which uses its NTD to interact with a protein receptor called CEACAM1. The NTD has a galectin-like protein fold, but binds sugar molecules somewhat differently than galectins. The observed binding of N-acetylneuraminic acid by the NTD and loss of that binding through mutation of the corresponding sugar binding pocket in emergent variants of concern has suggested a potential role for transient sugar-binding in the zoonosis of SARS-CoV-2, consistent with prior evolutionary proposals.

The CTD is responsible for the interactions of MERS-CoV with its receptor dipeptidyl peptidase-4, and those of SARS-CoV and SARS-CoV-2 with their receptor angiotensin-converting enzyme 2 (ACE2). The CTD of these viruses can be further divided into two subdomains, known as the core and the extended loop or receptor-binding motif (RBM), where most of the residues that directly contact the target receptor are located. There are subtle differences, mainly in the RBM, between the SARS-CoV and SARS-CoV-2 spike proteins' interactions with ACE2. Comparisons of spike proteins from multiple coronaviruses suggest that divergence in the RBM region can account for differences in target receptors, even when the core of the S1 CTD is structurally very similar.

Within coronavirus lineages, as well as across the four major coronavirus subgroups, the S1 region is less well conserved than S2, as befits its role in interacting with virus-specific host cell receptors. Within the S1 region, the NTD is more highly conserved than the CTD.

=== S2 ===
Coronavirus spike glycoprotein S2

Identifiers
- Symbol: CoV_S2
- Pfam: PF01601
- InterPro: IPR002552
Available protein structures:
- PDB: IPR002552 PF01601 (ECOD; PDBsum)
- AlphaFold: IPR002552; PF01601

The S2 region of spike glycoprotein is responsible for membrane fusion between the viral envelope and the host cell, enabling entry of the virus' genome into the cell. The S2 region contains the fusion peptide, a stretch of mostly hydrophobic amino acids whose function is to enter and destabilize the host cell membrane. S2 also contains two heptad repeat subdomains known as HR1 and HR2, sometimes called the "fusion core" region. These subdomains undergo dramatic conformational changes during the fusion process to form a six-helix bundle, a characteristic feature of the class I fusion proteins. The S2 region is also considered to include the transmembrane helix and C-terminal tail located in the interior of the virion.

Relative to S1, the S2 region is very well conserved among coronaviruses.

=== Post-translational modifications ===
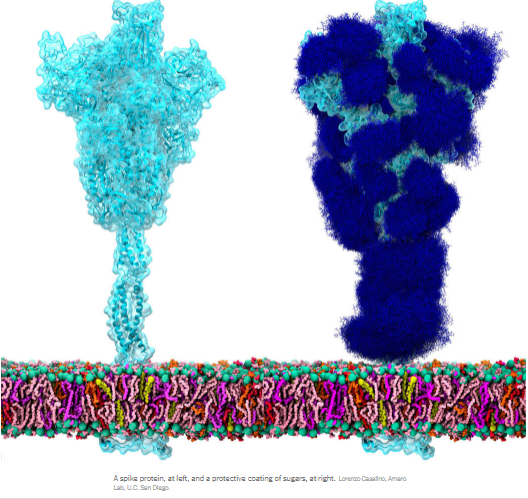
Spike protein illustrated with and without glycosylation.

Spike glycoprotein is heavily glycosylated through N-linked glycosylation. Studies of the SARS-CoV-2 spike protein have also reported O-linked glycosylation in the S1 region. The C-terminal tail, located in the interior of the virion, is enriched in cysteine residues and is palmitoylated.

Spike proteins are activated through proteolytic cleavage. They are cleaved by host cell proteases at the S1-S2 boundary and later at what is known as the S2' site at the N-terminus of the fusion peptide. This cleavage may occur upon receptor binding, or the spike protein may be pre-cleaved such as by Furin at a furin cleavage site if one is present.

=== Conformational change ===
Like other class I fusion proteins, the spike protein undergoes a very large conformational change during the fusion process. Both the pre-fusion and post-fusion states of several coronaviruses, especially SARS-CoV-2, have been studied by cryo-electron microscopy. Functionally important protein dynamics have also been observed within the pre-fusion state, in which the relative orientations of some of the S1 regions relative to S2 in a trimer can vary. In the closed state, all three S1 regions are packed closely and the region that makes contact with host cell receptors is sterically inaccessible, while the open states have one or two S1 RBDs more accessible for receptor binding, in an open or "up" conformation.

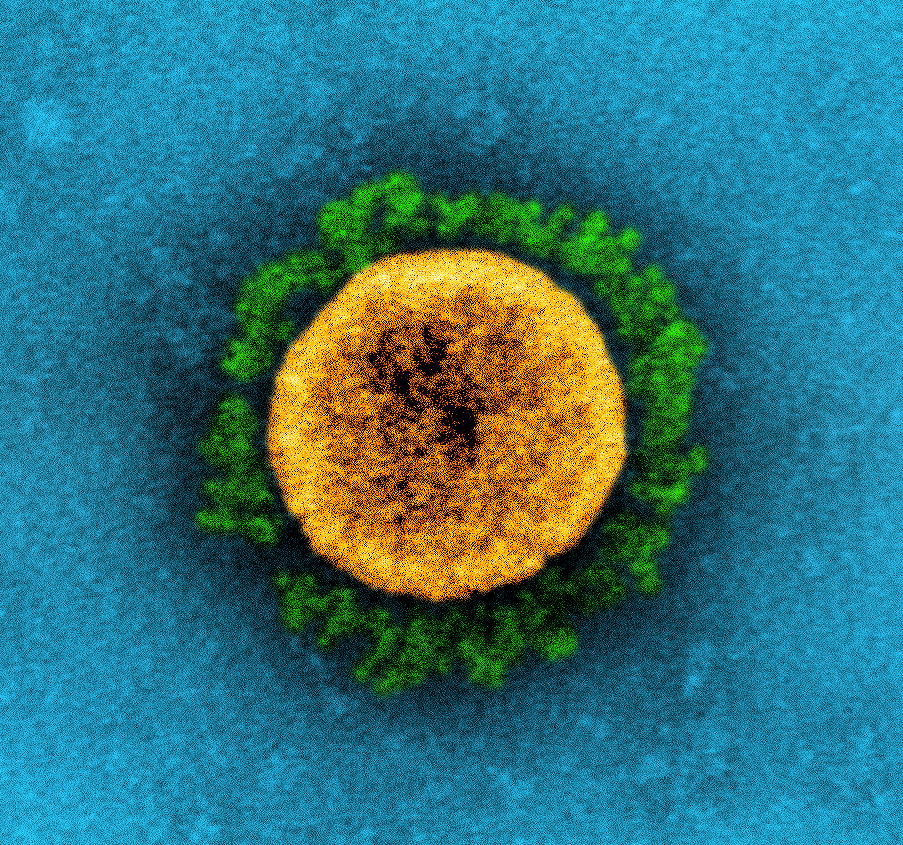
Transmission electron micrograph of a SARS-CoV-2 virion, showing the characteristic "corona" appearance with the spike proteins (green) forming prominent projections from the surface of the virion (yellow).

== Expression and localization ==
Genomic information
- Genomic organisation of isolate Wuhan-Hu-1, the earliest sequenced sample of SARS-CoV-2, indicating the location of the S gene
- Genome size: 29,903 bases
- Year of completion: 2020
- UCSC Genome Browser assembly ID: wuhCor1

The gene encoding the spike protein is located toward the 3' end of the virus's positive-sense RNA genome, along with the genes for the other three structural proteins and various virus-specific accessory proteins. Protein trafficking of spike proteins appears to depend on the coronavirus subgroup: when expressed in isolation without other viral proteins, spike proteins from betacoronaviruses are able to reach the cell surface, while those from alphacoronaviruses and gammacoronaviruses are retained intracellularly. In the presence of the M protein, spike protein trafficking is altered and instead is retained at the ERGIC, the site at which viral assembly occurs. In SARS-CoV-2, both the M and the E protein modulate spike protein trafficking through different mechanisms.

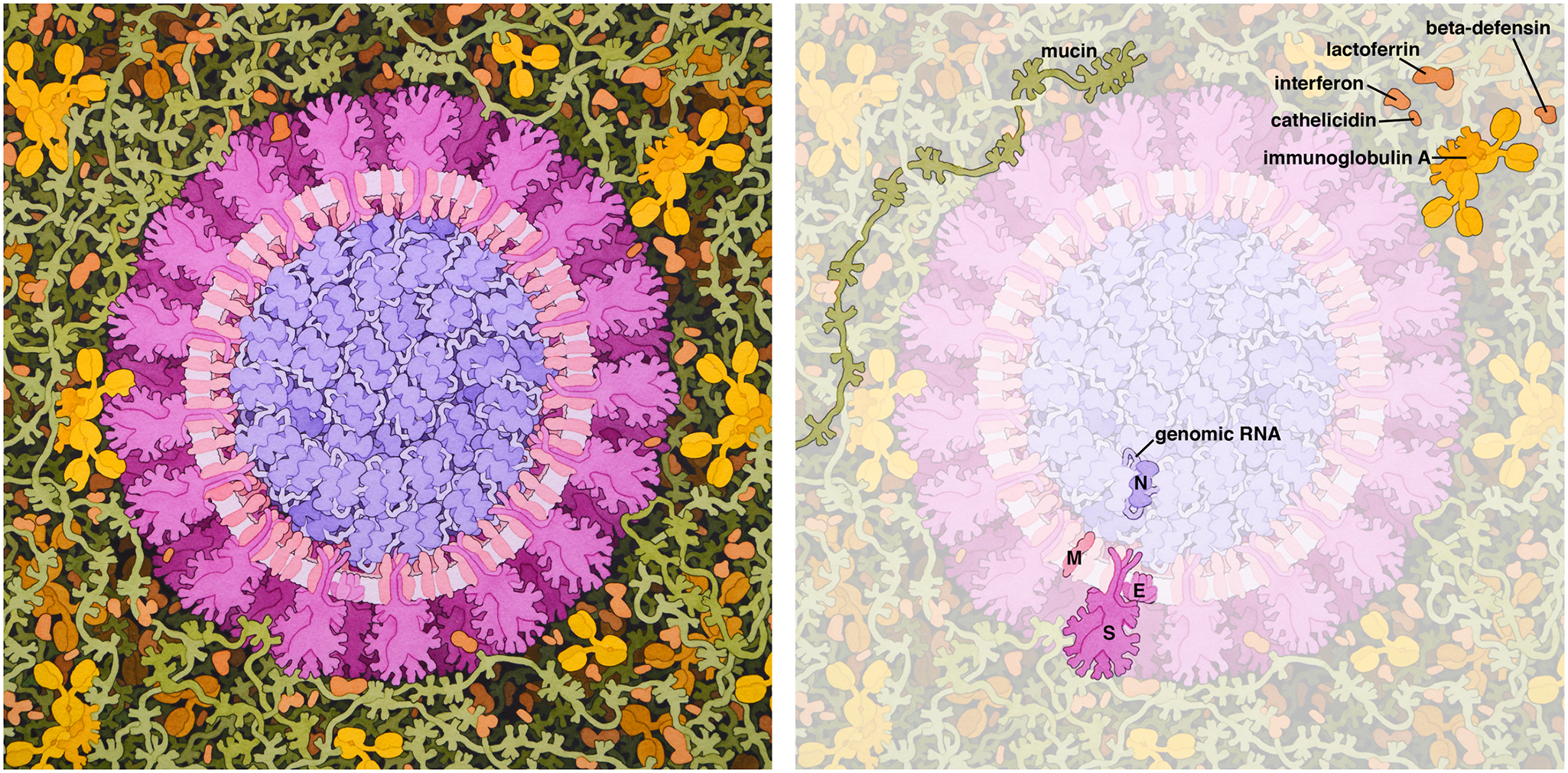
Illustration of a coronavirus virion in the respiratory mucosa, showing the positions of the four structural proteins and components of the extracellular environment.

The spike protein is not required for viral assembly or the formation of virus-like particles; however, presence of spike may influence the size of the envelope. Incorporation of the spike protein into virions during assembly and budding is dependent on protein-protein interactions with the M protein through the C-terminal tail. Examination of virions using cryo-electron microscopy suggests that there are approximately 25 to 100 spike trimers per virion.

== Function ==
The spike protein is responsible for viral entry into the host cell, a required early step in viral replication. It is essential for replication. It performs this function in two steps, first binding to a receptor on the surface of the host cell through interactions with the S1 region, and then fusing the viral and cellular membranes through the action of the S2 region. The location of fusion varies depending on the specific coronavirus, with some able to enter at the plasma membrane and others entering from endosomes after endocytosis.

=== Attachment ===
The interaction of the receptor-binding domain in the S1 region with its target receptor on the cell surface initiates the process of viral entry. Different coronaviruses target different cell-surface receptors, sometimes using sugar molecules such as sialic acids, or forming protein-protein interactions with proteins exposed on the cell surface. Different coronaviruses vary widely in their target receptor, although some such as SARS-CoV-1 and HCoV-NL63 use the same receptor despite having widely divergent spike proteins (21% amino acid identity, and only 14% in the RBD). The presence of a target receptor that S1 can bind is a determinant of host range and cell tropism. Human serum albumin binds to the S1 region, competing with ACE2 and therefore restricting viral entry into cells.

Human coronaviruses and their cell surface receptors
| Species | Genus | Receptor | Reference |
|---|---|---|---|
| Human coronavirus 229E | Alphacoronavirus | Aminopeptidase N | |
| Human coronavirus NL63 | Alphacoronavirus | Angiotensin-converting enzyme 2 | |
| Human coronavirus HKU1 | Betacoronavirus | N-acetyl-9-O-acetylneuraminic acid | |
| Human coronavirus OC43 | Betacoronavirus | N-acetyl-9-O-acetylneuraminic acid | |
| Middle East respiratory syndrome–related coronavirus | Betacoronavirus | Dipeptidyl peptidase-4 | |
| Severe acute respiratory syndrome coronavirus | Betacoronavirus | Angiotensin-converting enzyme 2 | |
| Severe acute respiratory syndrome coronavirus 2 | Betacoronavirus | Angiotensin-converting enzyme 2 and N-acetylneuraminic acid | |

=== Proteolytic cleavage ===
Proteolytic cleavage of the spike protein, sometimes known as "priming", is required for membrane fusion. Relative to other class I fusion proteins, this process is complex and requires two cleavages at different sites, one at the S1/S2 boundary and one at the S2' site to release the fusion peptide. Coronaviruses vary in which part of the viral life cycle these cleavages occur, particularly the S1/S2 cleavage. Many coronaviruses are cleaved at S1/S2 before viral exit from the virus-producing cell, by furin and other proprotein convertases; in SARS-CoV-2 a polybasic furin cleavage site is present at this position. Others may be cleaved by extracellular proteases such as elastase, by proteases located on the cell surface after receptor binding, or by proteases found in lysosomes after endocytosis. The specific proteases responsible for this cleavage depends on the virus, cell type, and local environment. In SARS-CoV, the serine protease TMPRSS2 is important for this process, with additional contributions from cysteine proteases cathepsin B and cathepsin L in endosomes. Trypsin and trypsin-like proteases have also been reported to contribute. In SARS-CoV-2, TMPRSS2 is the primary protease for S2' cleavage, and its presence is reported to be essential for viral infection, with cathepsin L protease being functional, but not essential.

=== Membrane fusion ===
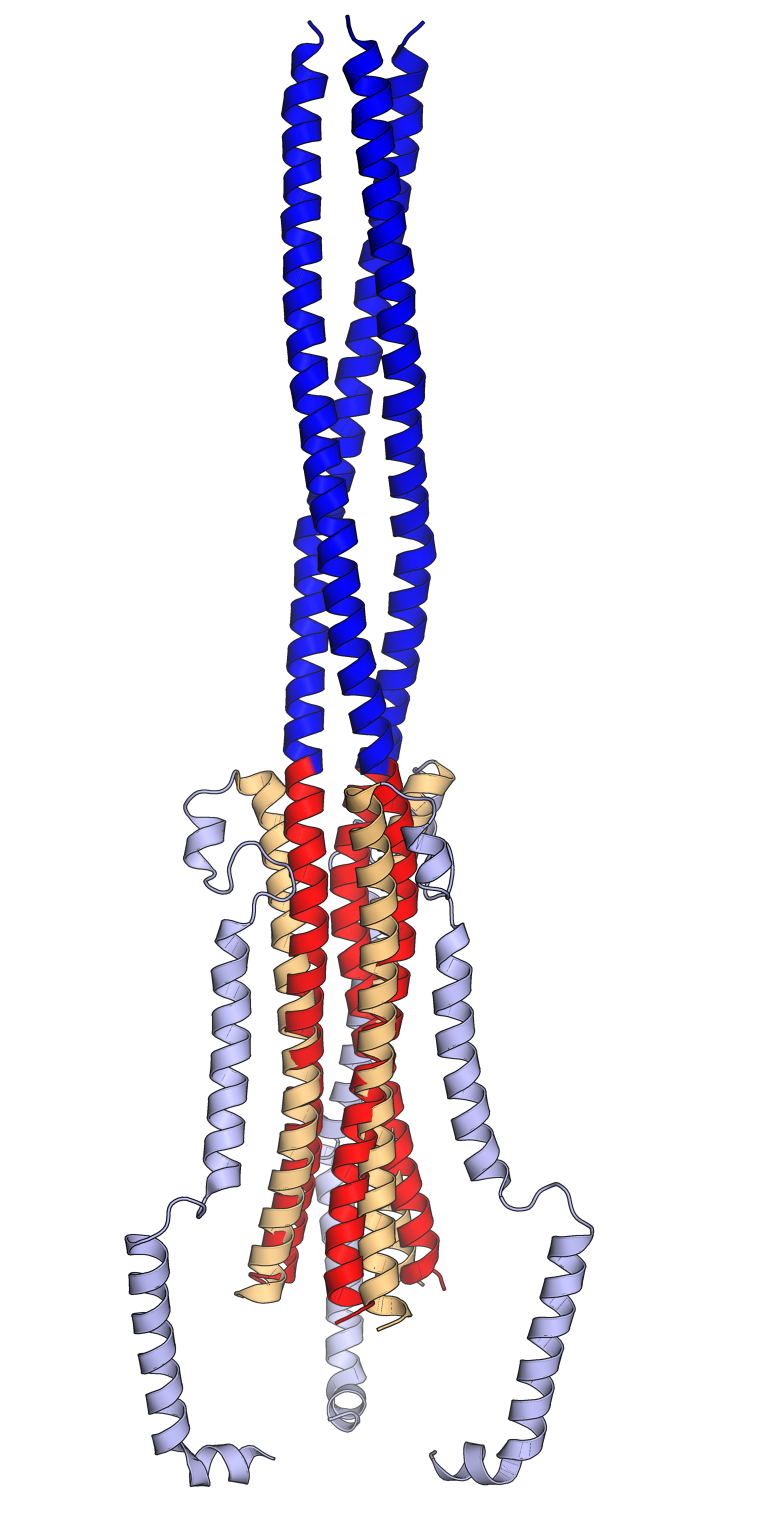
Comparison of the pre-fusion (orange, light blue) and post-fusion (red, dark blue) conformations of the SARS-CoV spike protein trimer. In the pre-fusion conformation, the central helix (orange) and heptad repeat 1 (HR1, light blue) are folded back on each other in an antiparallel orientation. In the post-fusion conformation, the central helix (red) and the HR1 sequence (dark blue) reorganize to form an extended trimeric coiled coil. The viral membrane is at the bottom and the host cell membrane at the top. Only key portions of the S2 subunit are shown. From PDB: 6NB6 (pre-fusion) and PDB: 6M3W (post-fusion).

Like other class I fusion proteins, the spike protein in its pre-fusion conformation is in a metastable state. A dramatic conformational change is triggered to induce the heptad repeats in the S2 region to refold into an extended six-helix bundle, causing the fusion peptide to interact with the cell membrane and bringing the viral and cell membranes into close proximity. Receptor binding and proteolytic cleavage (sometimes known as "priming") are required, but additional triggers for this conformational change vary depending on the coronavirus and local environment. In vitro studies of SARS-CoV suggest a dependence on calcium concentration. Unusually for coronaviruses, infectious bronchitis virus, which infects birds, can be triggered by low pH alone; for other coronaviruses, low pH is not itself a trigger but may be required for activity of proteases, which in turn are required for fusion. The location of membrane fusion—at the plasma membrane or in endosomes—may vary based on the availability of these triggers for conformational change. Fusion of the viral and cell membranes permits the entry of the virus' positive-sense RNA genome into the host cell cytosol, after which expression of viral proteins begins.

In addition to fusion of viral and host cell membranes, some coronavirus spike proteins can initiate membrane fusion between infected cells and neighboring cells, forming syncytia. This behavior can be observed in infected cells in cell culture. Syncytia have been observed in patient tissue samples from infections with SARS-CoV, MERS-CoV, and SARS-CoV-2, though some reports highlight a difference in syncytia formation between the SARS-CoV and SARS-CoV-2 spikes attributed to sequence differences near the S1/S2 cleavage site.

=== Immunogenicity ===
Because it is exposed on the surface of the virus, the spike protein is a major antigen to which neutralizing antibodies are developed. Its extensive glycosylation can serve as a glycan shield that hides epitopes from the immune system. Due to the outbreak of SARS and the COVID-19 pandemic, antibodies to SARS-CoV and SARS-CoV-2 spike proteins have been extensively studied. Antibodies to the SARS-CoV and SARS-CoV-2 spike proteins have been identified that target epitopes on the receptor-binding domain or interfere with the process of conformational change. The majority of antibodies from infected individuals target the receptor-binding domain. Antibodies targeting the S2 subunit of the spike protein, have also been reported to be effective against multiple variants of the SARS-CoV2.

== COVID-19 response ==
=== Vaccines ===
In response to the COVID-19 pandemic, a number of COVID-19 vaccines have been developed using a variety of technologies, including mRNA vaccines and viral vector vaccines. Most vaccine development has targeted the spike protein. Building on techniques previously used in vaccine research aimed at respiratory syncytial virus and SARS-CoV, many SARS-CoV-2 vaccine development efforts have used constructs that include mutations to stabilize the spike protein's pre-fusion conformation, facilitating development of antibodies against epitopes exposed in this conformation.

=== Monoclonal antibodies ===
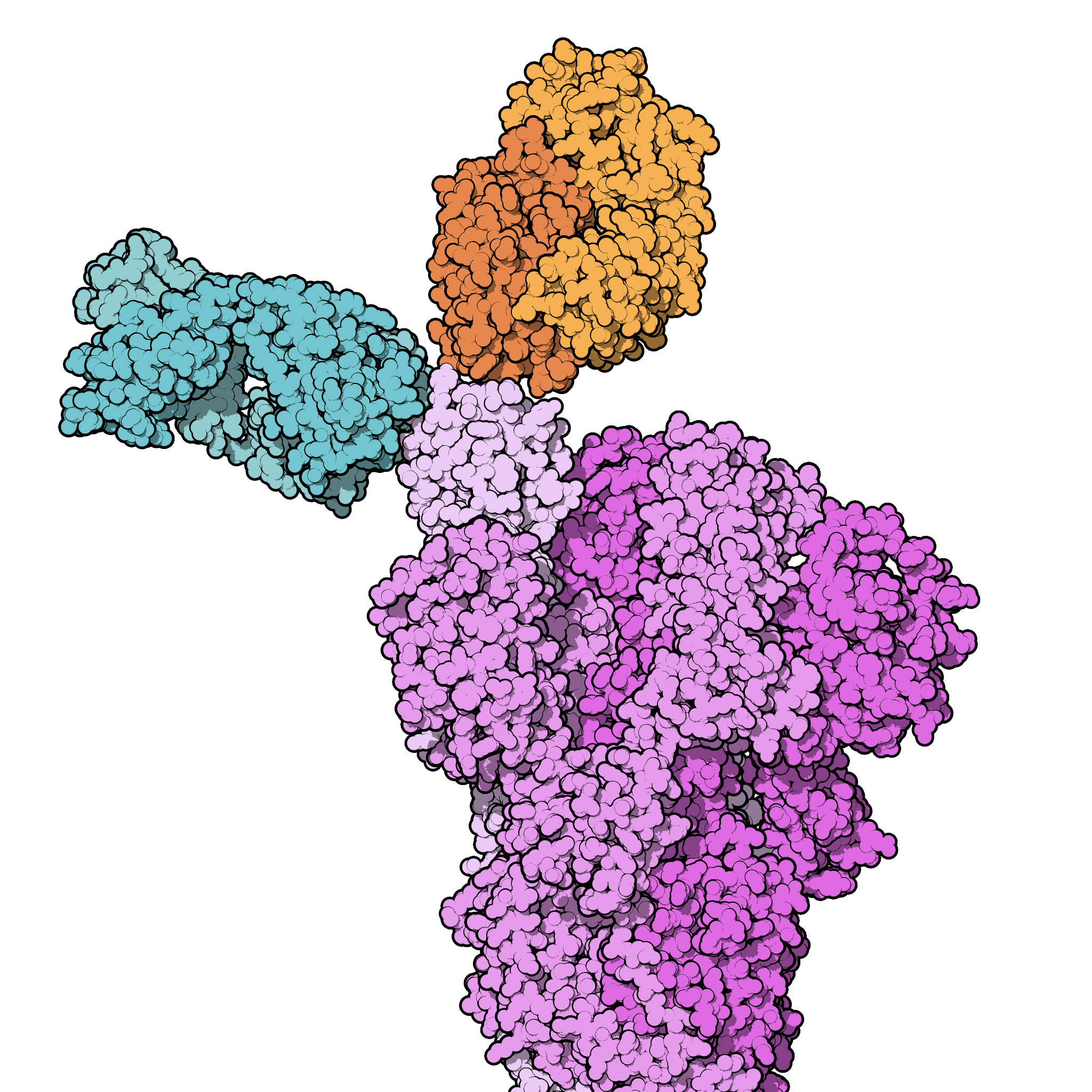
Casirivimab (blue) and imdevimab (orange) interacting with the receptor-binding domain of the spike protein (pink).

Monoclonal antibodies that target the receptor-binding domain of the spike protein have been developed as COVID-19 treatments. As of July 8, 2021, three monoclonal antibody products had received Emergency Use Authorization in the United States: bamlanivimab/etesevimab, casirivimab/imdevimab, and sotrovimab. Bamlanivimab/etesevimab was not recommended in the United States due to the increase in SARS-CoV-2 variants that are less susceptible to these antibodies.

=== SARS-CoV-2 variants ===
Throughout the COVID-19 pandemic, the genome of SARS-CoV-2 viruses was sequenced many times, resulting in identification of thousands of distinct variants. Many of these possess mutations that change the amino acid sequence of the spike protein. In a World Health Organization analysis from July 2020, the spike (S) gene was the second most frequently mutated in the genome, after ORF1ab (which encodes most of the virus' nonstructural proteins). The evolution rate in the spike gene is higher than that observed in the genome overall. Analyses of SARS-CoV-2 genomes suggests that some sites in the spike protein sequence, particularly in the receptor-binding domain, are of evolutionary importance and are undergoing positive selection.

Spike protein mutations raise concern because they may affect infectivity or transmissibility, or facilitate immune escape. The mutation D614G has arisen independently in multiple viral lineages and become dominant among sequenced genomes; it may have advantages in infectivity and transmissibility possibly due to increasing the density of spikes on the viral surface, increasing the proportion of binding-competent conformations or improving stability, but it does not affect vaccines. The mutation N501Y is common to the Alpha, Beta, Gamma and Omicron Variants of SARS-CoV-2 and has contributed to enhanced infection and transmission, reduced vaccine efficacy, and the ability of SARS-CoV-2 to infect new rodent species. N501Y increases the affinity of spike for human ACE2 by around 10-fold, which could underlie some of fitness advantages conferred by this mutation even though the relationship between affinity and infectivity is complex. The mutation P681R alters the furin cleavage site, and has been responsible for increased infectivity, transmission and global impact of the SARS-CoV-2 Delta variant. Mutations at position E484, particularly E484K, have been associated with immune escape and reduced antibody binding.

The SARS-CoV-2 Omicron variant is notable for having an unusually high number of mutations in the spike protein. The SARS CoV-2 spike gene (S gene, S-gene) mutation 69–70del (Δ69-70) causes a TaqPath PCR test probe to not bind to its S gene target, leading to S gene target failure (SGTF) in SARS CoV-2 positive samples. This effect was used as a marker to monitor the propagation of the Alpha variant and the Omicron variant.

=== Misinformation ===
During the COVID-19 pandemic, anti-vaccination misinformation about COVID-19 circulated on social media platforms related to the spike protein's role in COVID-19 vaccines. Spike proteins were said to be dangerously "cytotoxic" and mRNA vaccines containing them therefore in themselves dangerous. Spike proteins are not cytotoxic or dangerous. Spike proteins were also said to be "shed" by vaccinated people, in an erroneous allusion to the phenomenon of vaccine-induced viral shedding, which is a rare effect of live-virus vaccines unlike those used for COVID-19. "Shedding" of spike proteins is not possible.

== Evolution, conservation and recombination ==
The class I fusion proteins, a group whose well-characterized examples include the coronavirus spike protein, influenza virus hemagglutinin, and HIV Gp41, are thought to be evolutionarily related. The S2 region of the spike protein responsible for membrane fusion is more highly conserved than the S1 region responsible for receptor interactions. The S1 region appears to have undergone significant diversifying selection.

Within the S1 region, the N-terminal domain (NTD) is more conserved than the C-terminal domain (CTD). The NTD's galectin-like protein fold suggests a relationship with structurally similar cellular proteins from which it may have evolved through gene capture from the host. It has been suggested that the CTD may have evolved from the NTD by gene duplication. The surface-exposed position of the CTD, vulnerable to the host immune system, may place this region under high selective pressure. Comparisons of the structures of different coronavirus CTDs suggests they may be under diversifying selection and in some cases, distantly related coronaviruses that use the same cell-surface receptor may do so through convergent evolution.
