= Coronavirus envelope protein =

Major structure in coronaviruses

Envelope protein
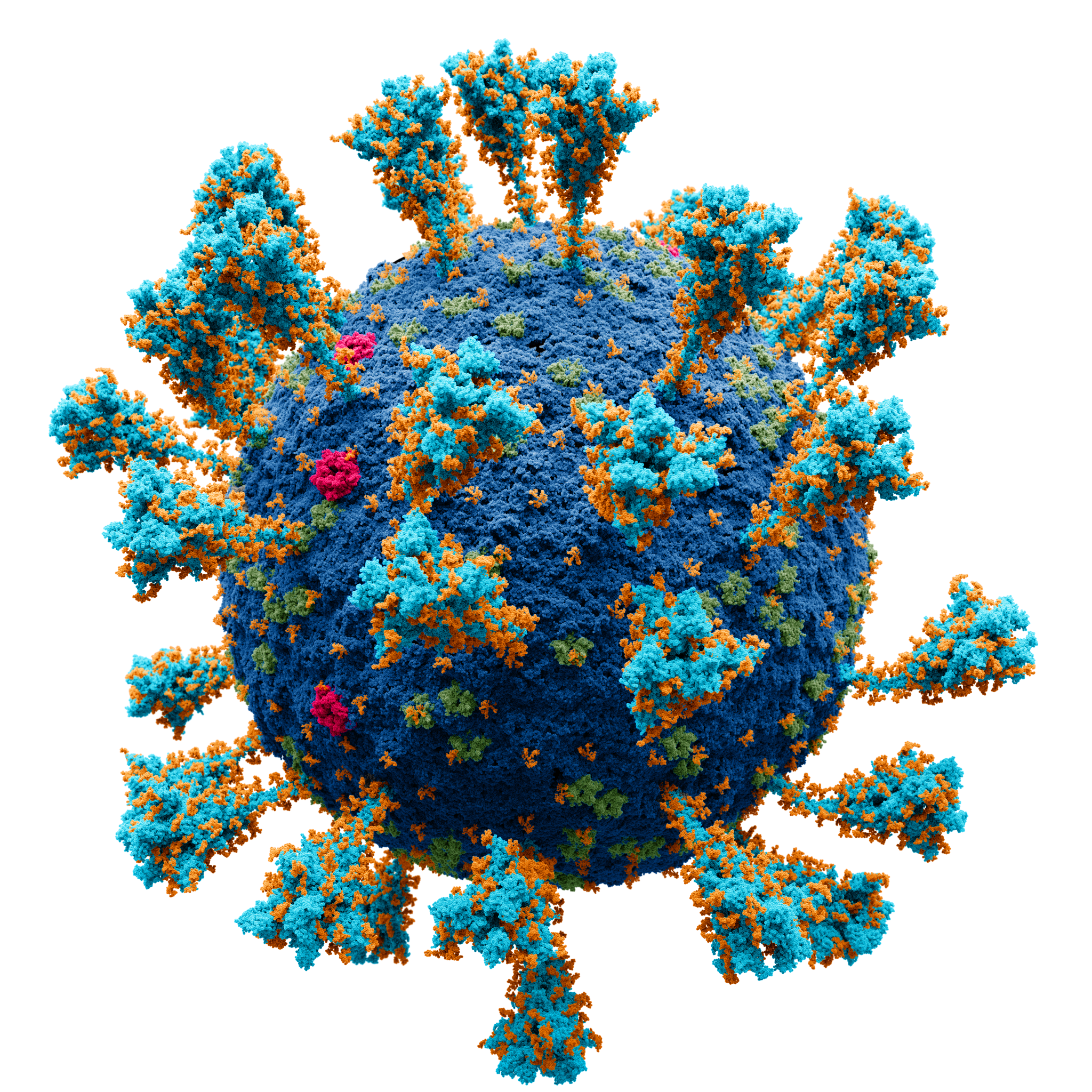
- Model of the external structure of the SARS-CoV-2 virion ● Blue: envelope ● Turquoise: spike glycoprotein (S) ● Bright Pink: envelope proteins (E) ● Green: membrane proteins (M) ● Orange: glycans

Identifiers
- Symbol: CoV_E
- Pfam: PF02723
- InterPro: IPR003873
- PROSITE: PS51926
Available protein structures:
- PDB: IPR003873 PF02723 (ECOD; PDBsum)
- AlphaFold: IPR003873; PF02723

The envelope (E) protein is the smallest and least well-characterized of the four major structural proteins found in coronavirus virions. It is an integral membrane protein less than 110 amino acid residues long; in SARS-CoV-2, the causative agent of COVID-19, the E protein is 75 residues long. Although it is not necessarily essential for viral replication, absence of the E protein may produce abnormally assembled viral capsids or reduced replication. E is a multifunctional protein and, in addition to its role as a structural protein in the viral capsid, it is thought to be involved in viral assembly, likely functions as a viroporin, and is involved in viral pathogenesis.

== Structure ==
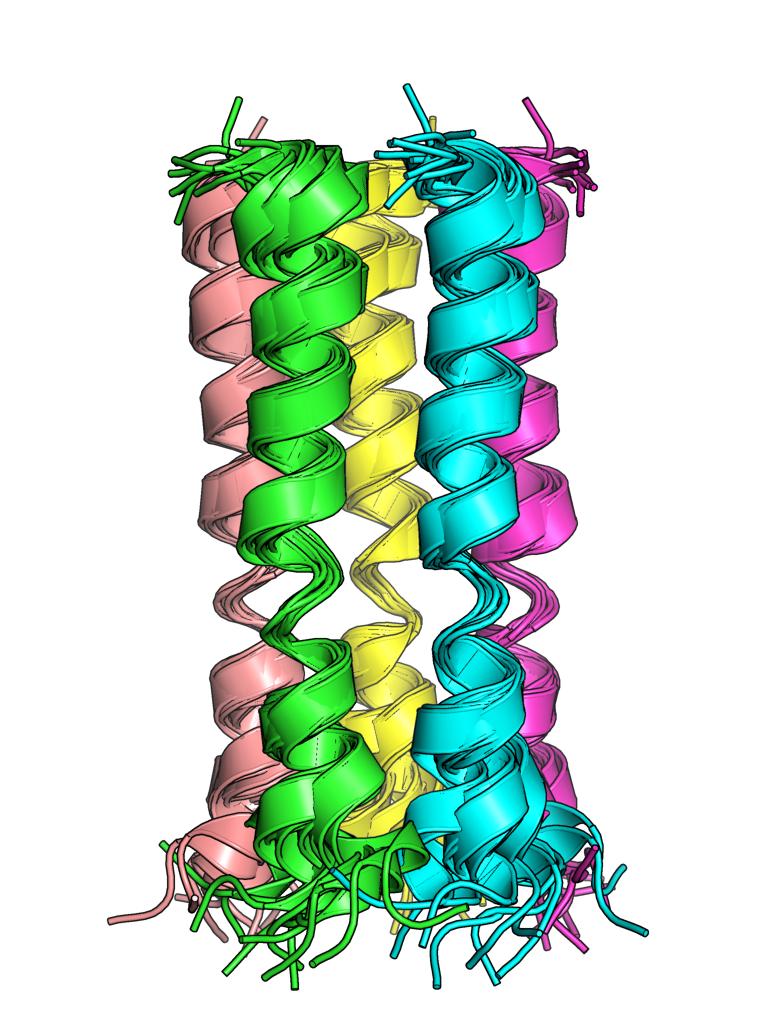
Solid-state NMR structure of the pentameric pore formed by the transmembrane helices of the SARS-CoV-2 E protein, which forms a viroporin permeable to cations. Rendered from PDB: 7K3G.

The E protein consists of a short hydrophilic N-terminal region, a hydrophobic helical transmembrane domain, and a somewhat hydrophilic C-terminal region. In SARS-CoV and SARS-CoV-2, the C-terminal region contains a PDZ-binding motif (PBM). This feature appears to be conserved only in the alpha and beta coronavirus groups, but not gamma. In the beta and gamma groups, a conserved proline residue is found in the C-terminal region likely involved in targeting the protein to the Golgi.

The transmembrane helices of the E proteins of SARS-CoV and SARS-CoV-2 can oligomerize and have been shown in vitro to form pentameric structures with central pores that serve as cation-selective ion channels. Both viruses' E protein pentamers have been structurally characterized by nuclear magnetic resonance spectroscopy.

The membrane topology of the E protein has been studied in a number of coronaviruses with inconsistent results; the protein's orientation in the membrane may be variable. The balance of evidence suggests the most common orientation has the C-terminus oriented toward the cytoplasm. Studies of SARS-CoV-2 E protein are consistent with this orientation.

=== Post-translational modifications ===
In some, but not all, coronaviruses, the E protein is post-translationally modified by palmitoylation on conserved cysteine residues. In the SARS-CoV E protein, one glycosylation site has been observed, which may influence membrane topology; however, the functional significance of E glycosylation is unclear. Ubiquitination of SARS-CoV E has also been described, though its functional significance is also not known.

== Expression and localization ==
Genomic information
- Genomic organisation of isolate Wuhan-Hu-1, the earliest sequenced sample of SARS-CoV-2, indicating the location of the E gene
- NCBI ID: MN908947
- Genome size: 29,903 bases
- Year of completion: 2020
- UCSC Genome Browser assembly ID: wuhCor1

The E protein is expressed at high abundance in infected cells. However, only a small amount of the total E protein produced is found in assembled virions. E protein is localized to the endoplasmic reticulum, Golgi apparatus, and endoplasmic-reticulum–Golgi intermediate compartment (ERGIC), the intracellular compartment that gives rise to the coronavirus viral envelope.

== Function ==
=== Essentiality ===
Studies in different coronaviruses have reached different conclusions about whether E is essential to viral replication. In some coronaviruses, including MERS-CoV, E has been reported to be essential. In others, including mouse coronavirus and SARS-CoV, E is not essential, though its absence reduces viral titer, in some cases by introducing propagation defects or causing abnormal capsid morphology.

=== Virions and viral assembly ===
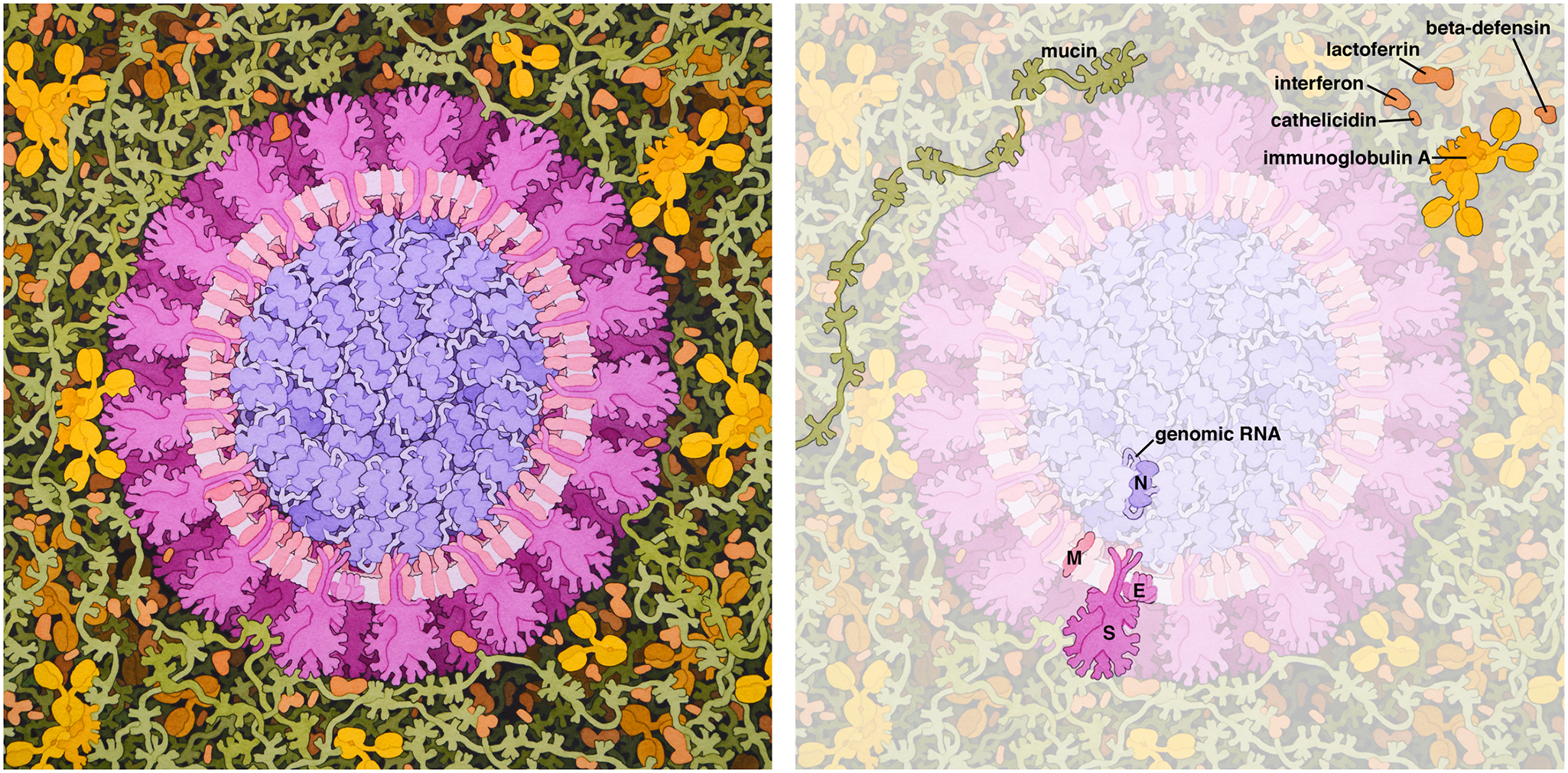
Illustration of a coronavirus virion in the respiratory mucosa, showing the positions of the four structural proteins and components of the extracellular environment

The E protein is found in assembled virions where it forms protein-protein interactions with the coronavirus membrane protein (M), the most abundant of the four structural proteins contained in the viral capsid. The interaction between E and M occurs through their respective C-termini on the cytoplasmic side of the membrane. In most coronaviruses, E and M are sufficient to form virus-like particles, though SARS-CoV has been reported to depend on N as well. There is good evidence that E is involved in inducing membrane curvature to create the typical spherical coronavirus virion. It is likely that E is involved in viral budding or scission, although its role in this process has not been well characterized.

=== Viroporin ===
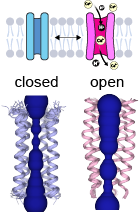
The E viroporin opens at acid pH. The open state in pink presents a wide N-terminus. Conversely, the C-terminus narrows in the open state, which brings the polar sidechains of Thr35 and Arg38 close to the hydrophobic gate at Leu28. This presumedly lowers the energy barrier for ions to cross the channel.

In its pentameric state, E forms cation-selective ion channels and likely functions as a viroporin. NMR studies show that viroporin presents an open conformation at low pH or in the presence of calcium ions, while the closed conformation is favored at basic pH. The NMR structure shows a hydrophobic gate at leucine 28 in the middle of the pore. The passage of ions through the gate is thought to be facilitated by the polar residues at the C-terminus.

The cation leakage may disrupt ion homeostasis, alter membrane permeability, and modulate pH in the host cell, which may facilitate viral release.

The E protein's role as a viroporin appears to be involved in pathogenesis and may be related to activation of the inflammasome. In SARS-CoV, mutations that disrupt E's ion channel function result in attenuated pathogenesis in animal models despite little effect on viral growth.

=== Interactions with host proteins ===
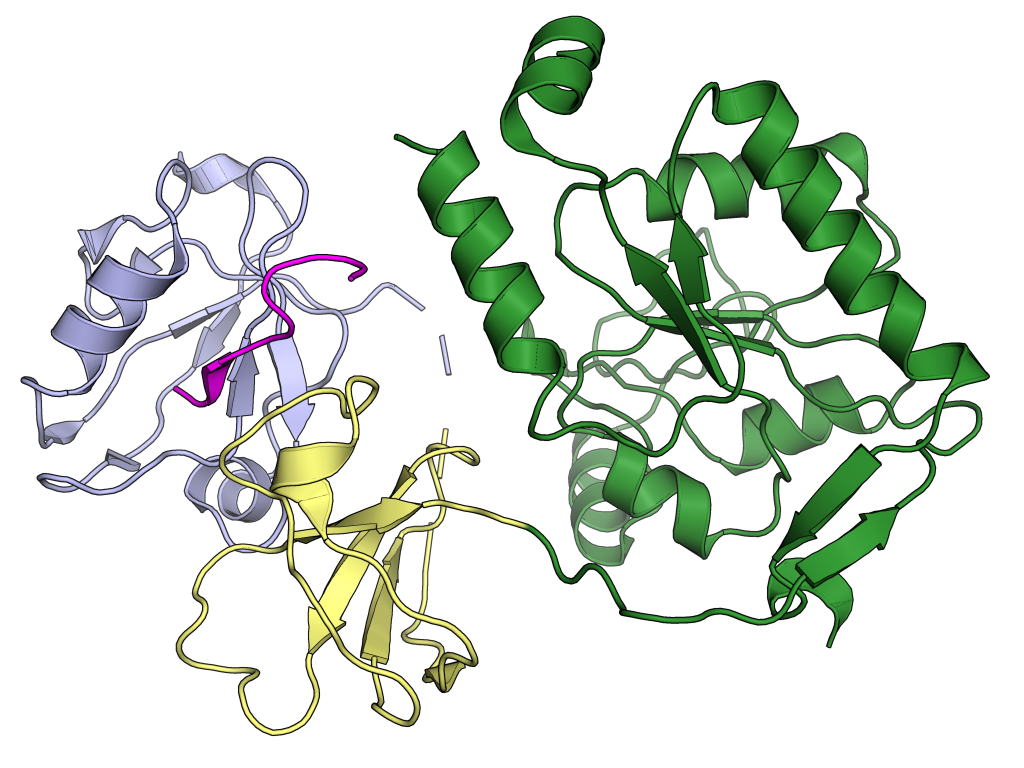
Cryo-electron microscopy structure of the interaction between the SARS-CoV-2 E protein PDZ-binding motif (magenta) and a construct containing the PDZ (blue), SH3 (yellow), and guanylate kinase-like (GK, green) domains from a host cell protein, human PALS1

Protein-protein interactions between E and proteins in the host cell are best described in SARS-CoV and occur via the C-terminal PDZ domain binding motif. The SARS-CoV E protein has been reported to interact with five host cell proteins: Bcl-xL, PALS1, syntenin, sodium/potassium (Na+/K+) ATPase α-1 subunit, and stomatin. The interaction with PALS1 may be related to pathogenesis via the resulting disruption in tight junctions. This interaction has also been identified in SARS-CoV-2.

== Evolution and conservation ==
The sequence of the E protein is not well conserved across coronavirus genera, with sequence identities reaching under 30%. In laboratory experiments on mouse hepatitis virus, substitution of E proteins from different coronaviruses, even from different groups, could produce viable viruses, suggesting that significant sequence diversity can be tolerated in functional E proteins. The SARS-CoV-2 E protein is very similar to that of SARS-CoV, with three substitutions and one deletion. A study of SARS-CoV-2 sequences suggests that the E protein is evolving relatively slowly compared to other structural proteins. The conserved nature of the envelope protein among SARS-CoV and SARS-CoV-2 variants has led it to be researched as a potential target for universal coronavirus vaccine development.
