= Coronavirus membrane protein =

Major structure in coronaviruses

Membrane protein
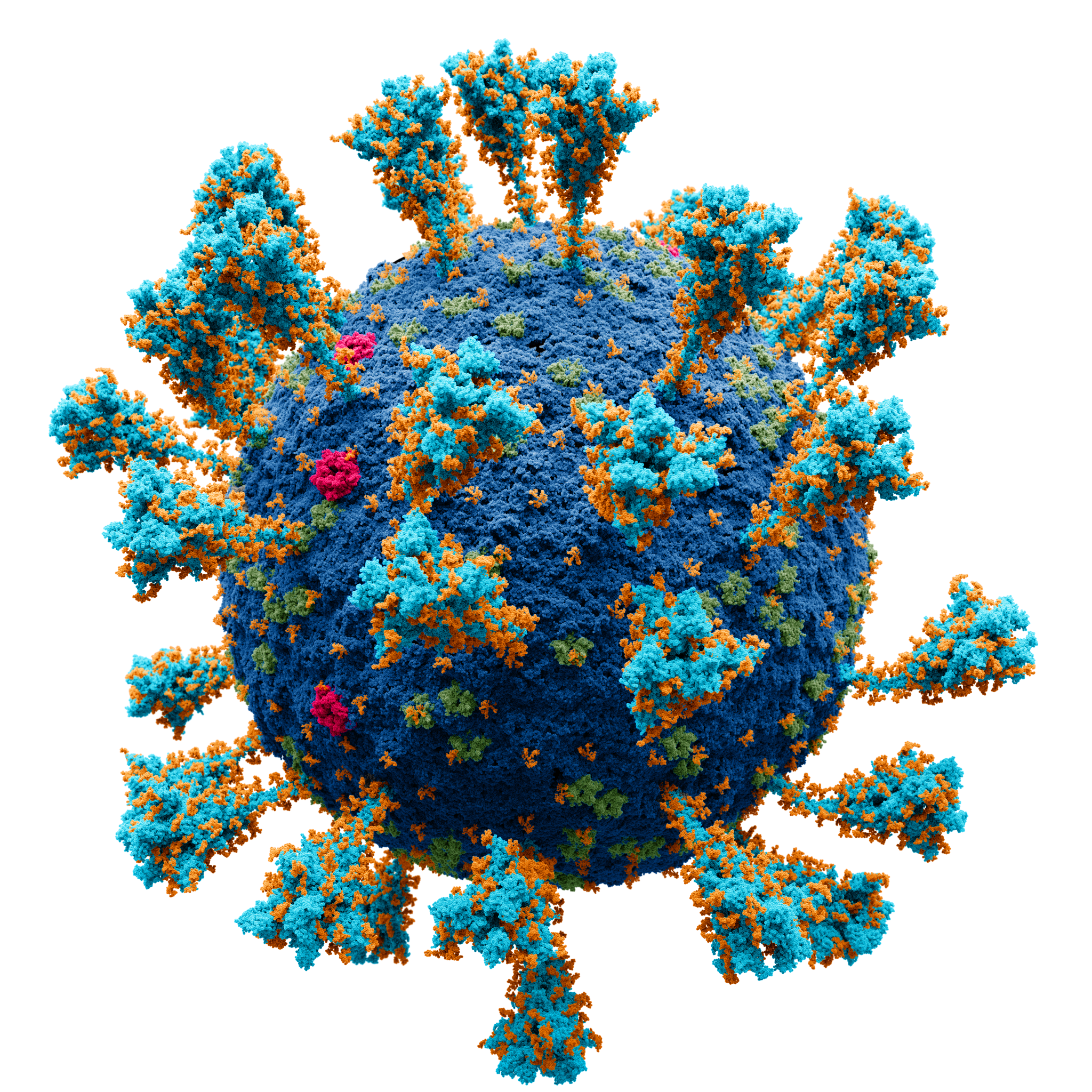
- Model of the external structure of the SARS-CoV-2 virion. ● Blue: envelope ● Turquoise: spike glycoprotein (S) ● Red: envelope proteins (E) ● Green: membrane proteins (M) ● Orange: glycans

Identifiers
- Symbol: CoV_M
- Pfam: PF01635
- InterPro: IPR002574
- PROSITE: PS51927
Available protein structures:
- PDB: IPR002574 PF01635 (ECOD; PDBsum)
- AlphaFold: IPR002574; PF01635

The membrane (M) protein (previously called E1, sometimes also matrix protein) is an integral membrane protein that is the most abundant of the four major structural proteins found in coronaviruses. The M protein organizes the assembly of coronavirus virions through protein-protein interactions with other M protein molecules as well as with the other three structural proteins, the envelope (E), spike (S), and nucleocapsid (N) proteins.

== Structure ==
The M protein is a transmembrane protein with three transmembrane domains and is around 230 amino acid residues long. In SARS-CoV-2, the causative agent of COVID-19, the M protein is 222 residues long. Its membrane topology orients the C-terminus toward the cytosolic face of the membrane and thus into the interior of the virion. It has a short N-terminal segment and a larger C-terminal domain. Although the protein sequence is not well conserved across all coronavirus groups, there is a conserved amphipathic region near the C-terminal end of the third transmembrane segment.

M functions as a homodimer. Studies of the M protein in multiple coronaviruses by cryo-electron microscopy have identified two distinct functional protein conformations, thought to have different roles in forming protein-protein interactions with other structural proteins. M protein of SARS-CoV-2 is homologous to the prokaryotic sugar transport protein SemiSWEET.

=== Post-translational modifications ===
M is a glycoprotein whose glycosylation varies according to coronavirus subgroup; N-linked glycosylation is typically found in the alpha and gamma groups while O-linked glycosylation is typically found in the beta group. There are some exceptions; for example, in SARS-CoV, a betacoronavirus, the M protein has one N-glycosylation site. Glycosylation state does not appear to have a measurable effect on viral growth. No other post-translational modifications have been described for the M protein.

== Expression and localization ==
Genomic information
- Genomic organisation of isolate Wuhan-Hu-1, the earliest sequenced sample of SARS-CoV-2, indicating the location of the M gene
- NCBI ID: MN908947
- Genome size: 29,903 bases
- Year of completion: 2020
- UCSC Genome Browser assembly ID: wuhCor1

The gene encoding the M protein is located toward the 3' end of the virus's positive-sense RNA genome, along with the genes for the other three structural proteins and various virus-specific accessory proteins. M is translated by membrane-bound polysomes to be inserted into the endoplasmic reticulum (ER) and trafficked to the endoplasmic reticulum-Golgi intermediate compartment (ERGIC), the intracellular compartment that gives rise to the coronavirus viral envelope, or to the Golgi apparatus. The exact localization is dependent on the specific virus protein. Investigations of the subcellular localization of the MERS-CoV M protein found C-terminal sequence signals associated with trafficking to the Golgi.

== Function ==
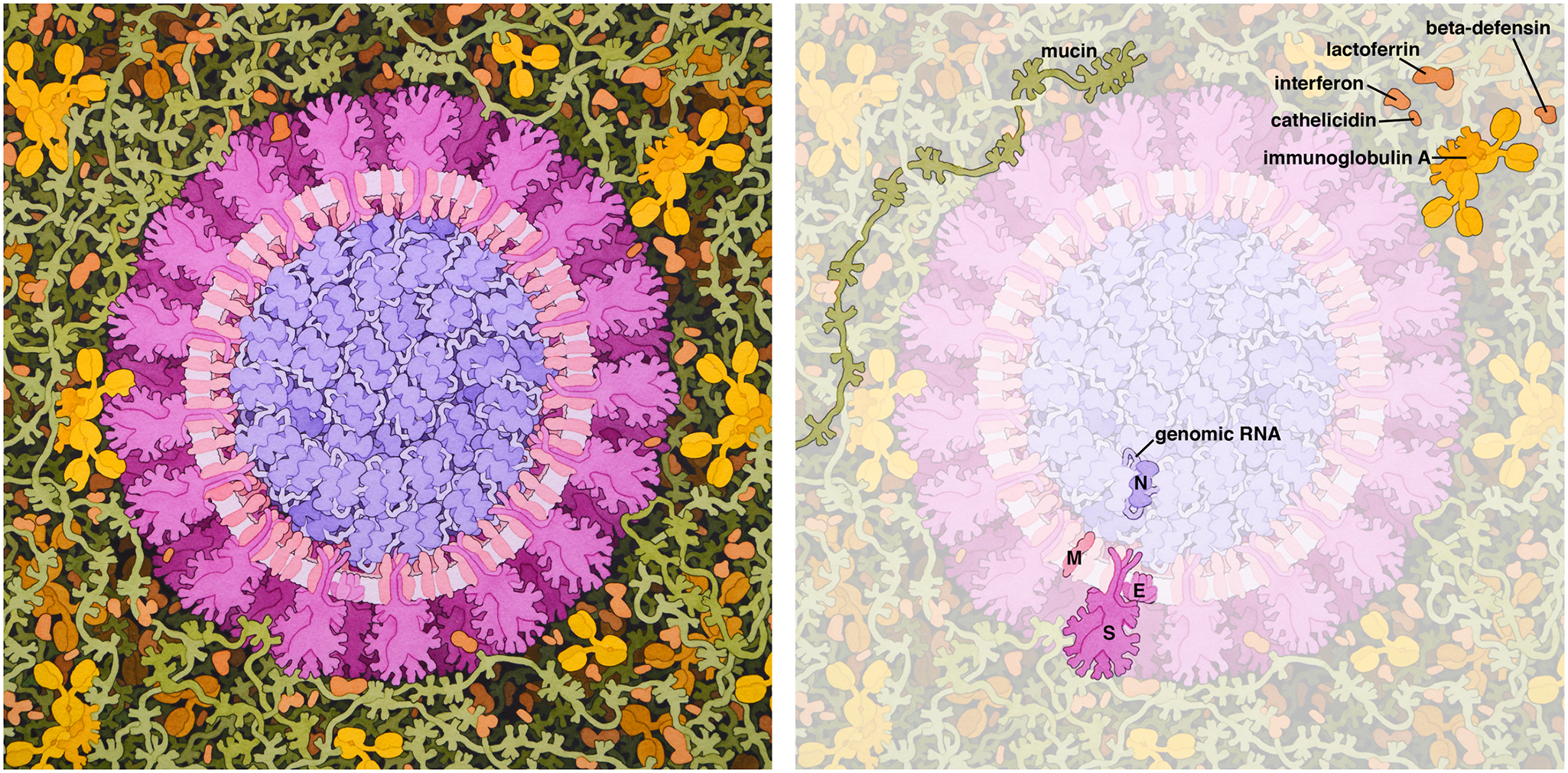
Illustration of a coronavirus virion in the respiratory mucosa, showing the positions of the four structural proteins and components of the extracellular environment.

The M protein is the most abundant protein in coronavirus virions. It is essential for viral replication.

=== Viral assembly ===
The primary function of the M protein is organizing assembly of new virions. It is involved in establishing viral shape and morphology. Individual M molecules interact with each other to form the viral envelope and may be able to exclude host cell proteins from the viral membrane. Studies of the SARS-CoV M protein suggest that M-M interactions involve both the N- and C-termini. Coronaviruses are moderately pleomorphic and conformational variations of M appear to be associated with virion size.

M forms protein-protein interactions with all three other major structural proteins. M is necessary but not sufficient for viral assembly; M and the E protein expressed together are reportedly sufficient to form virus-like particles, though some reports vary depending on experimental conditions and the specific virus studied. In some reports M appears to be capable of inducing membrane curvature, though others report M alone is insufficient for this and E is required. Although the E protein is not necessarily essential, it appears to be required for normal viral morphology and may be responsible for establishing curvature or initiating viral budding. M also appears to have functional roles in the later stages of viral maturation, secretion, and budding.

Incorporation of the spike protein (S) - which is required for assembly of infectious virions - is reported to occur though M interactions and may depend on specific conformations of M. The conserved amphipathic region C-terminal to the third transmembrane segment is important for spike interactions. Interactions with M appear to be required for correct subcellular localization of S at the viral budding site. M interacts directly with the nucleocapsid (N) protein without requiring the presence of RNA. This interaction appears to occur primarily through both proteins' C-termini.

=== Interactions with the immune system ===
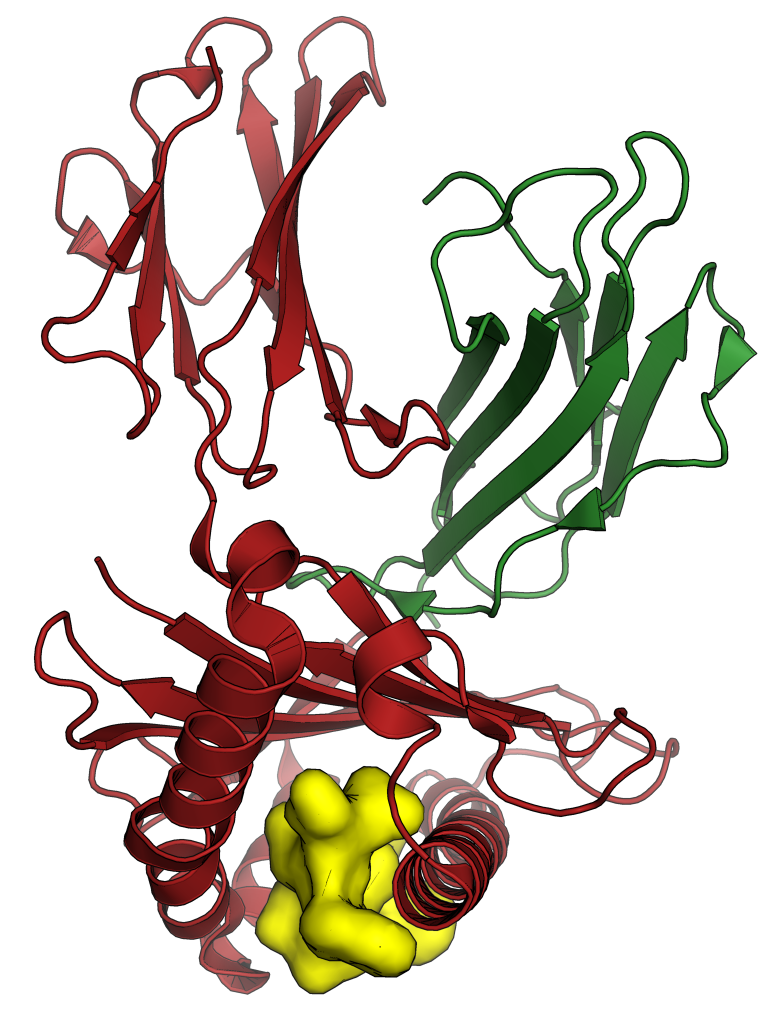
The human HLA-A*0201 (red) and beta-2 microglobulin (green) in complex with a peptide derived from the M protein of SARS-CoV (yellow, shown as surface). From PDB: 3I6G.

The M protein in MERS-CoV, SARS-CoV, and SARS-CoV-2 has been described as an antagonist of interferon response.

The M protein is immunogenic and has been reported to be a determinant of humoral immunity. Cytotoxic T cell responses to M have been described. Antibodies to epitopes found in the M protein have been identified in patients recovered from severe acute respiratory syndrome (SARS).

Other recent research has identified that SAS-COV-2 membrane protein when treated on human PBMC's causes a significant increase in pro inflammatory mediators such as TNF and IL-6. The effects of exogenous SARS-COV-2 membrane protein challenge in mice was also studied. In these studies, exogenous membrane protein treated intra nasally caused a significant increase in pulmonary inflammation in mice leading to histological changes within the lungs.

=== Host cell entry ===
It has been reported that human coronavirus NL63 relies on the M protein as well as the S protein to mediate host cell interactions preceding viral entry. M is thought to bind heparan sulfate proteoglycans exposed on the cell surface.

== Evolution and conservation ==
A study of SARS-CoV-2 sequences collected during the COVID-19 pandemic found that missense mutations in the M gene were relatively uncommon and suggested it was under purifying selection. Similar results have been described for broader population genetics analyses over a wider range of related viruses, finding that the sequences of M and several non-structural proteins in the coronavirus genome are most subject to evolutionary constraints.
