= N-glycosyltransferase =

Microbial gene found in Klebsiella aerogenes KCTC 2190

Glycosyl transferase family 41

Identifiers
- Symbol: GT41
- Pfam: PF13844
- CAZy: GT41
Available protein structures:
- PDB: PF13844 (ECOD; PDBsum)
- AlphaFold: PF13844

N-glycosyltransferase is an enzyme in prokaryotes which transfers individual hexoses onto asparagine sidechains in substrate proteins, using a nucleotide-bound intermediary, within the cytoplasm. They are distinct from regular N-glycosylating enzymes, which are oligosaccharyltransferases that transfer pre-assembled oligosaccharides. Both enzyme families however target a shared amino acid sequence asparagine—-any amino acid except proline—serine or threonine (N–x–S/T), with some variations.

Such enzymes have been found in the bacteria Actinobacillus pleuropneumoniae (whose N-glycosyltransferase is the best researched member of this enzyme family) and Haemophilus influenzae, and later in other bacterial species such as Escherichia coli. N-glycosyltransferases usually target adhesin proteins, which are involved in the attachment of bacterial cells to epithelia (in pathogenic bacteria); glycosylation is important for the stability and function of the adhesins.

== History and definition ==
N-glycosyltransferase activity was first discovered in 2003 by St. Geme et al. in Haemophilus influenzae and identified as a novel type of glycosyltransferase in 2010. The Actinobacillus pleuropneumoniae N-glycosyltransferase is the best researched enzyme of this family. Initially, protein glycosylation was considered to be a purely eukaryotic process before such processes were discovered in prokaryotes, including N-glycosyltransferases.

== Biochemistry ==
N-glycosyltransferases are an unusual (Note: Regular N-glycosyltransferases are oligosaccharide-transferring enzymes. Even though both enzyme families attach sugars to nitrogen, the Haemophilus influenzae N-glycosyltransferase bears no similarity to the oligosaccharyltransferases and appears to have evolved independently.) type of glycosyltransferase which joins single hexoses to the target protein. Attachment of sugars to the nitrogen atom in an amide group — such as the amide group of an asparagine — requires an enzyme, as the electrons of the nitrogen are delocalized in a pi-electron system with the carbon of the amide. Several mechanisms have been proposed for the activation. Among these are a deprotonation of the amide, an interaction between a hydroxyl group in the substrate sequon with the amide (a theory which is supported by the fact that the glycosylation rates appear to increase with the basicity of the second amino acid in the sequon) and two interactions involving acidic amino acids in the enzyme with each hydrogen atom of the amide group. This mechanism is supported by x-ray structures and biochemical information about glycosylation processes; the interaction breaks the delocalization and allows the electrons of the nitrogen to perform a nucleophilic attack on the sugar substrate.

N-glycosyltransferases from Actinobacillus pleuropneumoniae and Haemophilus influenzae use an asparagine-amino acid other than proline-serine or threonine sequences as target sequences, the same sequence used by oligosaccharyltransferases. The glutamine-469 residue in the Actinobacillus pleuropneumoniae N-glycosyltransferase and its homologues in other N-glycosyltransferases is important for the selectivity of the enzyme. The enzyme activity is further influenced by the amino acids around the sequon, with beta-loop structures especially important. At least the Actinobacillus pleuropneumoniae N-glycosyltransferase can also hydrolyze sugar-nucleotides in the absence of a substrate, a pattern frequently observed in glycosyltransferases, and some N-glycosyltransferases can attach additional hexoses on oxygen atoms of the protein-linked hexose. N-glycosylation by Actinobacillus pleuropneumoniae HMW1C does not require metals, consistent with observations made on other GT41 family glycosyltransferases and a distinction from oligosaccharyltransferases.

== Classification ==
Structurally N-glycosyltransferases belong to the GT41 family of glycosyltransferases and resemble protein O-GlcNAc transferase, a eukaryotic enzyme with various nuclear, mitochondrial and cytosolic targets. Regular N-linked oligosaccharyltransferases belong to a different protein family, STT3. The Haemophilus influenzae N-glycosyltransferase has domains with homologies to glutathione S-transferase and glycogen synthase.

The N-glycosyltransferases are subdivided into two functional classes, the first (e.g several Yersinia, Escherichia coli and Burkholderia sp.) is linked to trimeric autotransporter adhesins and the second has enzymes genomically linked to ribosome and carbohydrate metabolism associated proteins (e.g Actinobacillus pleuropneumoniae, Haemophilus ducreyi and Kingella kingae).

== Functions ==
N-linked glycosylation is an important process, especially in eukaryotes where over half of all proteins have N-linked sugars attached and where it is the most common form of glycosylation. The processes are also important in prokaryotes and archaeans. In animals for example protein processing in the endoplasmic reticulum and several functions of the immune system are dependent on glycosylation. (Note: N-glycosylation typically involves the attachment of oligosaccharides to asparagine amino groups in proteins; the asparagine is usually followed two amino acids later by a serine or a threonine. The oligosaccharide in most cases is assembled on an isoprenoid as carrier, with a variety of oligosaccharides used.)

The principal substrates of N-glycosyltransferases are adhesins. Adhesins are proteins that are used to colonize a surface, often a mucosal surface in the case of pathogenic bacteria. N-glycosyltransferase homologues have been found in pathogenic gammaproteobacteria, such as Yersinia and other pasteurellaceae. These homologues are very similar to the Actinobacillus pleuropneumoniae enzyme and can glycosylate the Haemophilus influenzae HMW1A adhesin.

N-glycosyltransferases may be a novel glycoengineering tool, considering that they do not require a lipid carrier to perform their function. Glycosylation is important for the function of many proteins and the production of glycosylated proteins can be a challenge. Potential uses of glycoengineering tools include the creation of vaccines against protein-bound polysaccharides.

=== Examples ===
- Actinobacillus pleuropneumoniae has a glycosyltransferase homologous to HMW1C that can N-glycosylate the Haemophilus influenzae HMW1A protein. The native substrates are autotransporter adhesins in Actinobacillus pleuropneumoniae such as AtaC and other pasteurellaceae. It uses the same target sequon like the Haemophilus influenzae HMW1C enzyme and oligosaccharyltransferases and it has been postulated that this sequence choice is for molecular mimicry reasons. In addition, it can also target other sequences such homoserine, however it is inactive against asparagines followed by a proline. In general, this enzyme is relatively unspecific in targeting proteins with the sequon. There are conflicting reports on whether it can use glutamine or perform hexose-hexose joining but it can act as an O-glycosyltransferase. Further, this enzyme uses preferably UDP-glucose over UDP-galactose, and can also use pentoses, mannose and GDP bound sugars but no substituted hexoses like N-acetylglucosamine. Its structure and the sites involved in substrate binding have been elucidated. The N-glycosyltransferase is accompanied by another glycosyltransferase which attaches glucose to a protein-bound glycan, and the two glycosyltransferases are part of an operon together with a third protein that is involved in the methylthiolation of ribosomes.
- Aggregatibacter aphrophilus expresses a HMW1C homologue. The substrate for the HMW1C homologue of Aggregatibacter aphrophilus is called EmaA and is an autotransporter protein. The Aggregatibacter aphrophilus glycosyltransferase is important for the adhesion of the bacterium to epithelia.
- In Haemophilus influenzae (a respiratory tract pathogen), the N-glycosyltransferase HMW1C attaches galactose and glucose taken from a nucleotide carrier to the HMW1A adhesin. The process is important for the stability of the HMW1A protein. Notably, HMW1C uses the N–X–S/T sequon as a substrate, the same sequon targeted by oligosaccharyltransferase, and can also attach additional hexoses to an already protein-bound hexose. The sugars are attached to an UDP carrier, the enzyme itself is cytoplasmic and transfers 47 hexoses on to its substrate HMW1A, although not all candidate sequons are targeted. It resembles O-glycosyltransferases in some aspects more than N-glycosylating enzymes, and is very similar to the Actinobacillus pleuropneumoniae enzyme. Structurally, it features a GT-B fold with two subdomains that resemble a Rossmann fold and an AAD domain. There is evidence that amino acid sequences containing the sequon are selected against in Haemophilus influenzae proteins, probably because the N-glycosyltransferase is not target specific and the presence of sequons would result in harmful glycosylation of off-target proteins. Haemophilus influenzae has an additional HMW1C homologue HMW2C, which together with the adhesin HMW2 forms a similar substrate-enzyme system. The genomic locus of HMW1C is right next to the locus of HMW1A.
- Enterotoxigenic Escherichia coli uses a N-glycosyltransferase called EtpC to modify the EtpA protein, which is orthologous to HMW1A of Haemophilus influenzae. EtpA operates as an adhesin that mediates the binding to intestinal epithelia and failure of glycosylation changes the adherence behaviour of the bacteria.
- Kingella kingae expresses a HMW1C homologue. The autotransporter protein Knh is the substrate of the HMW1C homologue of Kingella kingae. The glycosylation process is important for the ability of Kingella kingae to form bacterial aggregates and to bind to epithelia; in its absence adhesion and the expression of the Knh protein are impaired. The glycosylation process in Kingella kingae is not strictly bound to the consensus sequon.
- Yersinia enterocolitica has a functional N-glycosyltransferase. It also has a protein similar to HMW1C, but it is not known if it has the same activity.
- Other homologues have been found in Bibersteinia trehalosi, Burkholderia species, Escherichia coli, Haemophilus ducreyi, Mannheimia species, Xanthomonas species, Yersinia pestis and Yersinia pseudotuberculosis.
