= TUSC3 =

Protein-coding gene in the species Homo sapiens

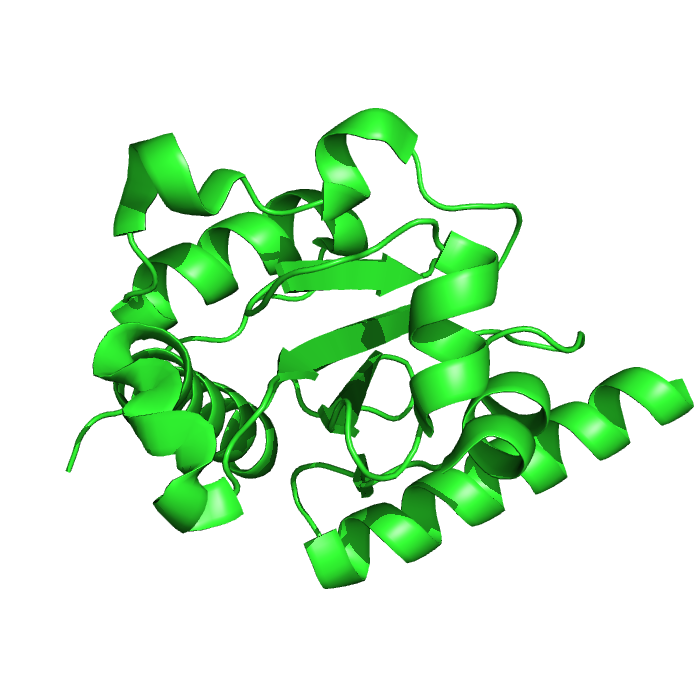

Identifiers
- Aliases: TUSC3, D8S1992, M33, MRT22, MRT7, N33, OST3A, tumor suppressor candidate 3, MagT2, SLC58A2
- External IDs: OMIM: 601385; MGI: 1933134; GeneCards: TUSC3
Available structures
PDB	Ortholog search: PDBe RCSB
PDB	List of PDB id codes 4M8G, 4M90, 4M91, 4M92

Gene location (Human)
Chr.	Chromosome 8 (human)
Band	8p22	Start	15,417,215 bp
Band	8p22	End	15,766,649 bp

Gene location (Mouse)
Chr.	Chromosome 8 (mouse)
Band	8|8 A4	Start	39,472,999 bp
Band	8|8 A4	End	39,619,367 bp
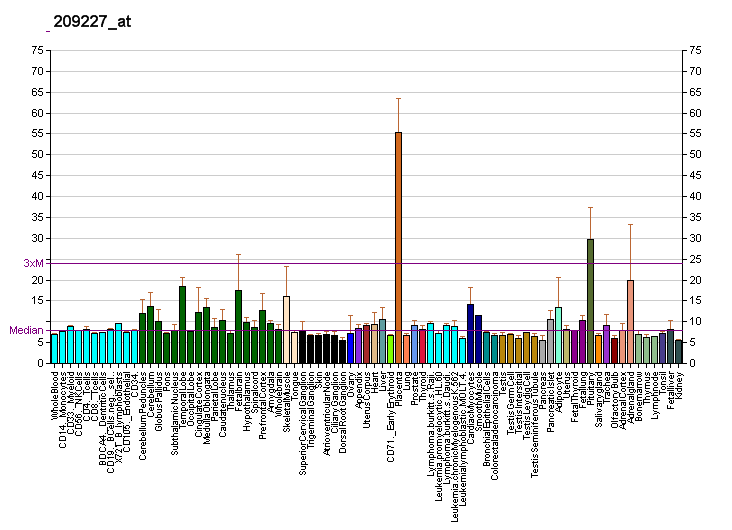

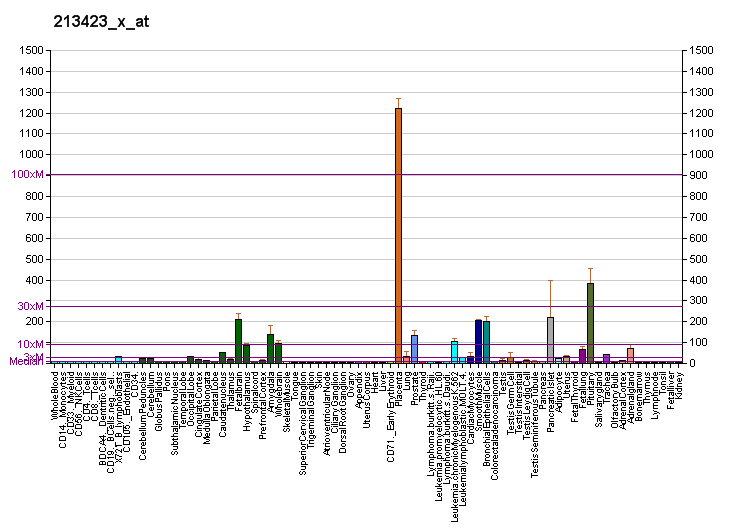

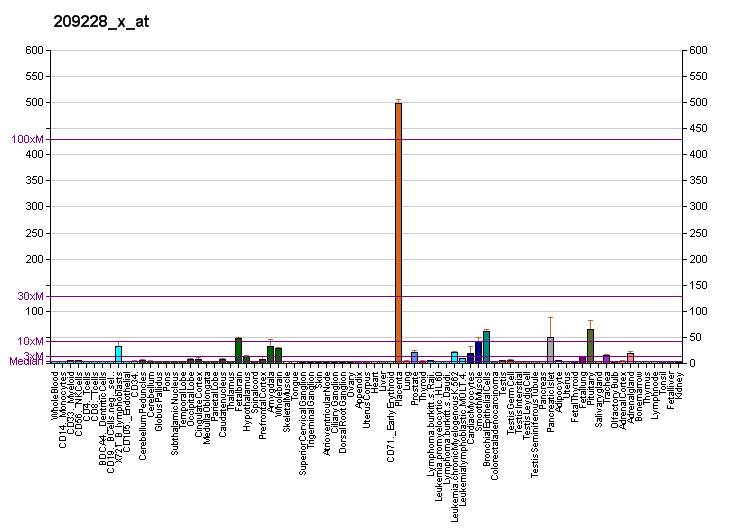
RNA expression pattern
Bgee	Human / Mouse (ortholog); Top expressed in: beta cell; stromal cell of endometrium; bronchial epithelial cell; right adrenal cortex; anterior pituitary; left adrenal gland; ventricular zone; left adrenal cortex; ganglionic eminence; olfactory zone of nasal mucosa / n/a; More reference expression data
BioGPS	More reference expression data
Gene ontology
Molecular function	magnesium ion transmembrane transporter activity; dolichyl-diphosphooligosaccharide-protein glycotransferase activity
Cellular component	integral component of membrane; oligosaccharyltransferase complex; plasma membrane; integral component of plasma membrane; endoplasmic reticulum membrane; endoplasmic reticulum; membrane; mitochondrion
Biological process	protein N-linked glycosylation; magnesium ion transport; cognition; transmembrane transport; magnesium ion transmembrane transport; protein glycosylation; protein N-linked glycosylation via asparagine
Sources:Amigo / QuickGO
Orthologs
Databases	NCBI: entry; OMA: entry
Species	Human	Mouse
Entrez	7991	80286
Ensembl	ENSG00000104723	ENSMUSG00000118664
UniProt	Q13454	Q8BTV1
RefSeq (mRNA)	NM_006765; NM_178234; NM_001356429	NM_030254; NM_001357304; NM_001357305; NM_001357306
RefSeq (protein)	NP_006756; NP_839952; NP_001343358	NP_084530; NP_001344233; NP_001344234; NP_001344235
Location (UCSC)	Chr 8: 15.42 – 15.77 Mb	Chr 8: 39.47 – 39.62 Mb
PubMed search
- Wikidata
View/Edit Human	View/Edit Mouse

u

Tumor suppressor candidate 3 (TUSC3) is a protein that in humans is encoded by the TUSC3 gene on chromosome 8p22. It is an integral membrane protein localized to the endoplasmic reticulum (ER) that contains an N-terminal thioredoxin-like domain.

TUSC3 has roles in N-linked glycosylation, ER quality control, and ER magnesium homeostasis. Historically characterized as an accessory subunit of the oligosaccharyltransferase (OST) complex, TUSC3 modulates the N-linked glycosylation of a subset of nascent proteins. It also acts at a later stage of N-glycan processing, as a substrate-specific regulator of ER quality control.

Regarding the cellular etiology of TUSC3-related intellectual disability, TUSC3's regulation of ER magnesium (Mg^{2+}) homeostasis plays a crucial role. A 2025 study established that TUSC3 functions as a key regulator of ER Mg^{2+} homeostasis, assembling into a functional complex with the ERMA (TMEM94) Mg^{2+} transporter, which is required for efficient Mg^{2+} uptake into the ER lumen. Loss-of-function variants in TUSC3 lead to luminal ER Mg^{2+} depletion, which initiates a cellular stress response now understood to be the primary driver of TUSC3-related intellectual disability.

Separately, TUSC3 has been studied as a candidate tumor suppressor gene in human cancers. As of 2026, cancer risk has not been reported in individuals with germline biallelic TUSC3 variants.

== Structure ==
TUSC3 is a multi-pass transmembrane protein of the endoplasmic reticulum (ER). It consists of a large N-terminal domain that faces the ER lumen and a C-terminal region containing four transmembrane helices that anchor the protein in the membrane. The luminal domain adopts a thioredoxin-like fold containing a conserved redox-active Cys-X-X-Cys motif and a substrate-binding groove.

TUSC3 is incorporated into the STT3B-containing oligosaccharyltransferase (OST) complex as one of two related accessory subunits, the other being MAGT1. TUSC3 also forms a complex with the ER magnesium (Mg^{2+}) transporter ERMA (TMEM94), and this complex is required for efficient Mg^{2+} uptake into the ER lumen.

== Function ==
=== N-linked glycosylation ===
N-linked glycosylation is the enzymatic process in which a preassembled oligosaccharide (sugar chain) is transferred to specific asparagine residues within Asn-X-Ser/Thr consensus sequences of nascent polypeptides. This process occurs within the endoplasmic reticulum (ER) lumen and is catalyzed by the oligosaccharyltransferase (OST) complex. Historically, primary disruptions to this pathway have been classified as congenital disorders of glycosylation (CDG).

==== Mechanism ====
Mammalian cells express two functional variants of the OST complex: STT3A, which operates co-translationally at the translocon, and STT3B, which operates post-translationally to glycosylate acceptor sites skipped by STT3A. TUSC3, together with its paralog MAGT1, selectively associates with the STT3B complex.

TUSC3 and MAGT1 share high sequence identity and display functional redundancy within the STT3B complex. Simultaneous loss of both TUSC3 and MAGT1 severely impairs STT3B-dependent glycosylation, causing accumulated misfolded proteins in the ER, activation of the unfolded protein response, and ER stress-induced apoptosis. However, knockout of TUSC3 alone does not cause systemic N-glycan loss or alter serum glycoprotein patterns in most tissues, as MAGT1 compensates for its absence. Thus, loss of TUSC3 does not produce a systemic glycosylation defect.

Although TUSC3 and MAGT1 show functional redundancy in vitro, their endogenous expression patterns differ significantly in vivo: MAGT1 is predominantly expressed in immune cells, whereas TUSC3 expression is highly enriched in the central nervous system. As a result, the loss of TUSC3 cannot be adequately compensated for in brain tissue due to insufficient local MAGT1 expression, leading to tissue-specific neurological pathology.

ER quality control and glucose trimming

Beyond its role in initial glycan transfer, TUSC3 functions at a post-translational stage of N-glycan processing to regulate ER quality control (ERQC). TUSC3 acts as a substrate-specific regulator that promotes G2-to-G1 glucose trimming on target glycoproteins, such as bone morphogenetic protein 4 (BMP4) and its Drosophila ortholog Decapentaplegic (Dpp). By facilitating this trimming step, TUSC3 serves as a gatekeeper for substrate entry into the ERQC cycle, influencing whether target proteins successfully fold and enter the secretory pathway or are directed toward ER-associated degradation.

=== Magnesium homeostasis ===
Beyond its association with the oligosaccharyltransferase (OST) complex, TUSC3 serves an essential regulatory role in maintaining endoplasmic reticulum (ER) magnesium (Mg^{2+}) homeostasis. TUSC3 lacks an intrinsic ion-channel or transport pore. Instead, it forms an ER-localized protein complex with ERMA (ER Mg^{2+} ATPase, encoded by the TMEM94 gene), a P-type ATPase responsible for driving Mg^{2+}uptake into the ER lumen. Within this transport complex, TUSC3 regulates and enhances ERMA transport kinetics, acting as a required accessory subunit for efficient luminal Mg^{2+} reuptake.

Loss-of-function variants in TUSC3 result in a selective depletion of luminal ER Mg^{2+} without altering cytosolic magnesium levels. Because divalent cations are required for the proper activity of ER-resident chaperones, this localized deficit triggers chronic ER stress. Luminal Mg^{2+} depletion selectively activates the PERK-eIF2α pathway of the unfolded protein response, while leaving the IRE1-XBP1 and ATF6 pathways largely unaffected.

In neural tissues, where TUSC3 expression is highly enriched compared to peripheral tissues, sustained PERK activation selectively suppresses the translation of key postsynaptic proteins—including PSD-93, PSD-95, and GluA1—and impairs CREB phosphorylation. TUSC3 knockout mouse models display neurodevelopmental deficits characteristic of human autosomal recessive intellectual disability, including impaired spatial learning, memory, and social behavior. Fibroblasts derived from patients with TUSC3 mutations similarly exhibit ER Mg^{2+} deficiency and heightened baseline unfolded protein response activation.

Restoration of ER Mg^{2+} levels through targeted magnesium supplementation (such as magnesium L-threonate) mitigates PERK-mediated ER stress, restores synaptic protein translation, and reduces cognitive deficits in model systems. This evidence establishes ER Mg^{2+} dysregulation, rather than a primary glycosylation failure, as the primary pathogenic driver of TUSC3-associated neurodevelopmental pathology.

TUSC3 deficiency pathway

== Intellectual disability ==
=== Clinical presentation and genetics ===
Autosomal recessive inheritance pattern

Biallelic loss-of-function variants in TUSC3 cause a form of non-syndromic autosomal recessive intellectual disability, historically designated as MRT7 (also known as intellectual disability autosomal recessive 7). The condition is ultra-rare, with only a limited number of families and roughly two dozen affected individuals reported worldwide. It follows autosomal recessive inheritance, meaning both copies of the TUSC3 gene must be affected for the disorder to manifest, and heterozygous carriers are typically unaffected.

Reported genetic alterations include loss-of-function point mutations (missense, nonsense, frameshift, and splice-site variants) as well as genomic microdeletions encompassing the TUSC3 locus on chromosome 8p22. Affected individuals typically present in early childhood with variable developmental delay, prominent speech impairment, behavioral features (such as hyperactivity, impulsivity, autistic traits, or emotional dysregulation), and moderate-to-severe cognitive deficits. Because TUSC3 expression is highly enriched in neural tissues relative to peripheral tissues, systemic organ involvement, major dysmorphic features, and metabolic abnormalities are generally absent.

At the cellular level, patient-derived fibroblasts and neuronal models exhibit reduced luminal endoplasmic reticulum (ER) magnesium (Mg^{2+}) concentrations and elevated baseline unfolded protein response signaling via the PERK pathway. Because the disease mechanism stems from ER Mg^{2+} transporter dysfunction rather than a primary disruption of protein glycosylation, standard biomarker screens for N-linked glycosylation defects—such as serum transferrin isoelectric focusing—are typically normal in affected individuals. Diagnosis is established through genetic testing, most commonly whole exome sequencing or targeted gene panels that identify biallelic variants or deletions involving TUSC3.

=== Paradigm shift: from glycosylation to magnesium dysregulation ===
A Congenital disorder of glycosylation (CDG) was the first proposed disease association for TUSC3, following the 2008 discovery of TUSC3 mutations in patients with non-syndromic autosomal recessive intellectual disability. Because TUSC3 encodes a non-catalytic accessory subunit of the endoplasmic reticulum (ER)-bound oligosaccharyltransferase (OST) complex, early studies classified the condition as a CDG (historically termed TUSC3-CDG). However, this classification lacked direct biochemical evidence of a glycosylation defect; both founding studies reported normal results on routine clinical glycosylation screens in patient fibroblasts—an atypical finding that left the disease mechanism unresolved for seventeen years.

A critical turning point came in 2009, when TUSC3 and its paralog MAGT1 were identified as major mediators of cellular magnesium (Mg^{2+}) influx, demonstrating that TUSC3 knockdown significantly lowers intracellular Mg^{2+} concentrations. The decisive advance occurred in 2025 with landmark research that provided the primary mechanistic link. That work established that TUSC3 functions as an essential accessory subunit of the ER magnesium transporter ERMA (TMEM94), forming an ER localized complex required for efficient Mg^{2+} uptake into the ER lumen. Loss of TUSC3 produces selective depletion of luminal Mg^{2+} without altering cytosolic magnesium levels. The same 2025 study examined N-glycosylation of candidate substrates—including the magnesium transporter CNNM3 and the neuronal proteins NCAM1, N-cadherin, and GluA2—in TUSC3 knockout models and found no detectable defect, resolving the long-standing discrepancy with normal clinical glycosylation screens.

Instead, loss of TUSC3 produces a luminal ER Mg^{2+} deficit that selectively activates the PERK-eIF2α branch of the unfolded protein response while leaving the IRE1-XBP1 and ATF6 pathways largely unaffected. This selective, chronic ER stress—driven directly by Mg^{2+} dysregulation—is especially consequential in neural tissues, where TUSC3 expression is highly enriched and local MAGT1 expression is insufficient to compensate. Sustained PERK activation impairs synaptic translation, suppressing key synaptic proteins (including PSD-93, PSD-95, and GluA1) and impairing CREB phosphorylation. These molecular changes drive the synaptic and cognitive deficits characteristic of the intellectual disability phenotype. TUSC3 knockout mouse models recapitulate the human neurodevelopmental features, including impairments in spatial learning, memory, and social behavior.

Subsequent 2026 research further clarified that, while TUSC3 is not required for global N-glycosylation, it also functions downstream during N-glycan processing as a substrate-specific regulator of G2-to-G1 glucose trimming on selected targets such as BMP4/Dpp. These two distinct roles—primary regulation of ER Mg^{2+} homeostasis and limited, substrate-specific glycan processing—explain why loss of TUSC3 does not produce the systemic N-glycosylation failure seen in classic CDGs but instead causes discrete ER stress and signaling dysregulation.

=== Management and potential therapies ===
The 2025 study demonstrated that restoring endoplasmic reticulum (ER) magnesium (Mg^{2+}) levels via oral administration of the brain-permeable compound magnesium L-threonate reversed PERK-mediated stress and cognitive deficits in TUSC3 knockout mouse models. Patient-derived fibroblasts likewise showed ER Mg^{2+} deficiency together with elevated baseline ER stress that could be mitigated by magnesium supplementation. These findings established ER Mg^{2+} dysregulation—rather than a primary, systemic glycosylation failure—as the key driver of neurodevelopmental dysfunction in TUSC3-related intellectual disability. Consequently, the disorder is now more accurately characterized as a magnesium homeostasis disorder rather than a primary CDG, although the historical “TUSC3-CDG” designation persists in some databases.

Clinical management currently relies on supportive care, individualized educational programs, and behavioral, speech, occupational, and physical therapies. As of late 2026, no targeted, disease-modifying medications or gene-editing therapies have received formal FDA or EMA regulatory approval specifically for TUSC3-related intellectual disability.

However, the preclinical evidence that targeted supplementation with brain-permeable magnesium L-threonate can restore luminal ER Mg^{2+} levels, alleviate chronic PERK-mediated ER stress, and rescue synaptic and cognitive deficits provides the first biologically grounded therapeutic rationale for the disorder. These findings indicate that magnesium supplementation holds promising therapeutic potential for TUSC3-related intellectual disability and support continued research as well as carefully monitored individualized clinical exploration. Because formal large-scale clinical trials face significant feasibility challenges due to limited funding and the extremely small number of known patients, individual approaches—such as carefully monitored off-label or N-of-1 clinical trials of accessible, well-tolerated, magnesium supplements—have been proposed as practical strategies to evaluate efficacy in this ultra-rare condition.

Because TUSC3 deficiency produces chronic PERK-mediated suppression of protein translation, reduced levels of key synaptic proteins, impaired CREB signaling, and ongoing ER stress, the cellular consequences of the disorder may interact with the mechanisms of certain medications used for common comorbidities. Clinicians may therefore wish to consider these pathway-level effects when selecting pharmacological treatments. No disease-specific prescribing guidelines currently exist, and any such considerations must be individualized and balanced against the known efficacy and safety profiles of available therapies.

TUSC3 deficiency rescue pathway with magnesium L-threonate (MgT)

== Cancer ==
TUSC3 has been examined in cancer research; both reduced and increased expression have been reported, with effects that appear context-dependent. More research is needed to determine when TUSC3 acts as a tumor suppressor versus an oncogene.

Somatic loss or silencing of TUSC3 has been associated with various cancers. In contrast, clinical reports of individuals with germline biallelic TUSC3 variants have focused on neurodevelopmental features, such as intellectual disability and developmental delay. As of 2026, cancer risk has not been reported in these individuals.
