= PGIB =

PGIB could stand for:

- Undecaprenyl-diphosphooligosaccharide-protein glycotransferase, an enzyme
- Progressive Group for Independent Business
