= OST4 =

Identifiers
- Aliases: OST4, oligosaccharyltransferase complex subunit 4, non-catalytic
- External IDs: GeneCards: OST4
Available structures
PDB	Human UniProt search: PDBe RCSB
PDB	List of PDB id codes 2LAT

Gene location (Human)
Chr.	Chromosome 2 (human)
Band	2p23.3	Start	27,070,472 bp
Band	2p23.3	End	27,071,654 bp
RNA expression pattern
Bgee	Human / Mouse (ortholog); Top expressed in: monocyte; granulocyte; skin of arm; left coronary artery; right coronary artery; right adrenal gland; right adrenal cortex; cardiac muscle tissue of right atrium; smooth muscle tissue; left adrenal gland / n/a; More reference expression data
BioGPS	n/a
Orthologs
Databases	NCBI: entry; OMA: entry
Species	Human	Mouse
Entrez	100128731	n/a
Ensembl	ENSG00000228474	n/a
UniProt	P0C6T2	n/a
RefSeq (mRNA)	NM_001134693	n/a
RefSeq (protein)	NP_001128165	n/a
Location (UCSC)	Chr 2: 27.07 – 27.07 Mb	n/a
PubMed search		n/a
- Wikidata
View/Edit Human

Oligosaccaryltransferase
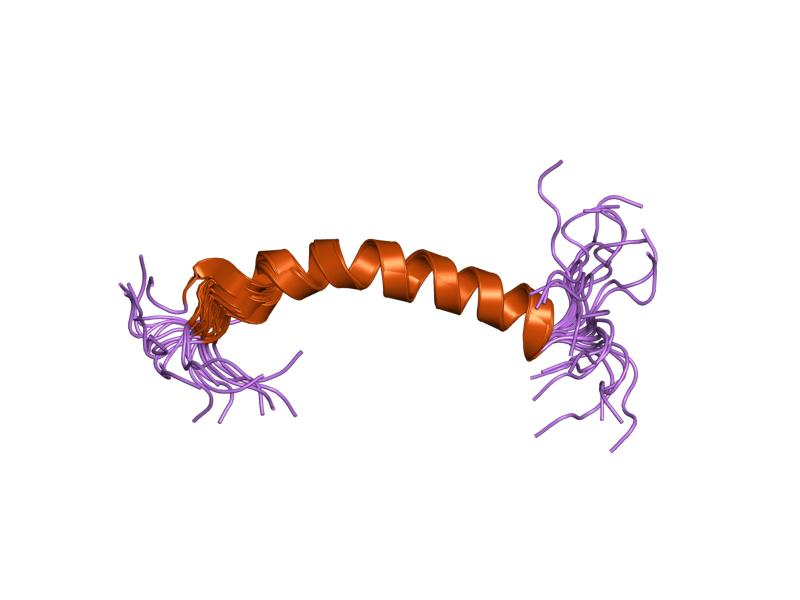
- nmr structure of yeast oligosaccharyltransferase subunit ost4p

Identifiers
- Symbol: Ost4
- Pfam: PF10215
- InterPro: IPR018943
- OPM superfamily: 242
- OPM protein: 2lat
- Membranome: 465
Available protein structures:
- PDB: IPR018943 PF10215 (ECOD; PDBsum)
- AlphaFold: IPR018943; PF10215

Oligosaccharyltransferase complex subunit 4, non-catalytic, also called Dolichyl-diphosphooligosaccharide—protein glycosyltransferase subunit 4, is a protein that in humans is encoded by the OST4 gene. This protein is a subunit of the oligosaccharyltransferase complex.

OST4 is a very short, approximately 30 amino acids, protein found from fungi to vertebrates. It appears to be an integral membrane protein that mediates the en bloc transfer of a pre-assembled high-mannose oligosaccharide onto asparagine residues of nascent polypeptides as they enter the lumen of the rough endoplasmic reticulum.

== See also ==
- Dolichyl-diphosphooligosaccharide–protein glycotransferase – the enzyme class of the protein complex
