= Transmembrane protein 94 =

Protein-coding gene in the species Homo sapiens

TMEM94

Identifiers
- Aliases: TMEM94, KIAA0195, transmembrane protein 94, IDDCDF
- External IDs: OMIM: 618163; MGI: 1919197; GeneCards: TMEM94

Gene location (Human)
Chr.	Chromosome 17 (human)
Band	17q25.1	Start	75,441,159 bp
Band	17q25.1	End	75,500,452 bp

Gene location (Mouse)
Chr.	Chromosome 11 (mouse)
Band	11|11 E2	Start	115,765,433 bp
Band	11|11 E2	End	115,799,366 bp
RNA expression pattern
Bgee	Human / Mouse (ortholog); Top expressed in: right hemisphere of cerebellum; right frontal lobe; nucleus accumbens; right adrenal cortex; putamen; pituitary gland; left adrenal cortex; sural nerve; right uterine tube; caudate nucleus / Top expressed in: muscle of thigh; yolk sac; skeletal muscle tissue; superior frontal gyrus; genital tubercle; tail of embryo; primary visual cortex; granulocyte; lip; right kidney; More reference expression data
BioGPS	n/a
Orthologs
Databases	NCBI: entry; OMA: entry
Species	Human	Mouse
Entrez	9772	71947
Ensembl	ENSG00000177728	ENSMUSG00000020747
UniProt	Q12767	Q7TSH8
RefSeq (mRNA)	NM_014738; NM_001321148; NM_001321149; NM_001351202; NM_001351203	NM_028014
RefSeq (protein)	NP_001308077; NP_001308078; NP_055553; NP_001338131; NP_001338132 NP_055553.3	NP_082290
Location (UCSC)	Chr 17: 75.44 – 75.5 Mb	Chr 11: 115.77 – 115.8 Mb
PubMed search
- Wikidata
View/Edit Human	View/Edit Mouse

Transmembrane protein 94 (also known as ERMA, ER Magnesium ATPase) is a protein that in humans is encoded by the TMEM94 gene on chromosome 17q25.1.

TMEM94 is a P-type ATPase located in the endoplasmic reticulum (ER) membrane. It functions as the primary transporter that moves magnesium (Mg2+) into the ER lumen. Efficient transport requires the accessory protein TUSC3, which forms a complex with ERMA (TMEM94) and enhances its activity.

Loss of either TMEM94 or its regulatory partner TUSC3 causes depletion of Mg2+ inside the ER. This triggers selective activation of the PERK stress pathway, reduces production of key synaptic proteins, and leads to neurodevelopmental deficits.

Biallelic loss-of-function variants in TUSC3 cause autosomal recessive intellectual disability; the same pathway is implicated when TMEM94 function is disrupted.

The TMEM94 protein is also referred to in the literature under the alias IDDCDF.
