= STT3B =

Protein-coding gene in the species Homo sapiens

Identifiers
- Aliases: STT3B, CDG1X, SIMP, STT3-B, catalytic subunit of the oligosaccharyltransferase complex, STT3 oligosaccharyltransferase complex catalytic subunit B
- External IDs: OMIM: 608605; MGI: 1915542; GeneCards: STT3B
Enzyme activity
| EC # | BRENDA | ExPASy | KEGG | MetaCyc |
|---|---|---|---|---|
| 2.4.99.18 | ↗ | ↗ | ↗ | ↗ |

Gene location (Human)
| Chr. | Chromosome 3 (human) |
| Band | 3p23 | Start | 31,532,638 bp |
| Band | 3p23 | End | 31,637,616 bp |

Gene location (Mouse)
| Chr. | Chromosome 9 (mouse) |
| Band | 9|9 F3 | Start | 115,071,649 bp |
| Band | 9|9 F3 | End | 115,139,489 bp |
RNA expression pattern
| Bgee | Human / Mouse (ortholog); Top expressed in: mucosa of ileum; cardiac muscle tissue of right atrium; skin of arm; corpus epididymis; myocardium of left ventricle; thymus; Achilles tendon; retinal pigment epithelium; caput epididymis; tibialis anterior muscle / Top expressed in: seminal vesicula; transitional epithelium of urinary bladder; lacrimal gland; human fetus; migratory enteric neural crest cell; calvaria; epithelium of stomach; vas deferens; molar; left colon; More reference expression data |
| BioGPS | n/a |
Gene ontology
| Molecular function | transferase activity; oligosaccharyl transferase activity; dolichyl-diphosphooligosaccharide-protein glycotransferase activity; glycosyltransferase activity; metal ion binding; protein binding |
| Cellular component | integral component of membrane; oligosaccharyltransferase complex; endoplasmic reticulum; membrane; endoplasmic reticulum membrane; protein-containing complex; oligosaccharyltransferase I complex |
| Biological process | post-translational protein modification; protein glycosylation; co-translational protein modification; response to unfolded protein; protein N-linked glycosylation via asparagine; ubiquitin-dependent ERAD pathway; glycoprotein catabolic process |
Sources:Amigo / QuickGO
Orthologs
| Databases | NCBI: entry; OMA: entry |
| Species | Human | Mouse |
| Entrez | 201595 | 68292 |
| Ensembl | ENSG00000163527 | ENSMUSG00000032437 |
| UniProt | Q8TCJ2 | Q3TDQ1 |
| RefSeq (mRNA) | NM_178862 | NM_024222 |
| RefSeq (protein) | NP_849193 | NP_077184 |
| Location (UCSC) | Chr 3: 31.53 – 31.64 Mb | Chr 9: 115.07 – 115.14 Mb |
| PubMed search |
- Wikidata
| View/Edit Human | View/Edit Mouse |

Dolichyl-diphosphooligosaccharide—protein glycosyltransferase subunit STT3B is an enzyme that in humans is encoded by the STT3B gene.

== Function ==
The STT3B protein contains a highly immunogenic minor histocompatibility antigen epitope of 9 amino acids, B6(dom1). Like ITM1 (MIM 601134), STT3B is homologous to yeast STT3, an oligosaccharyltransferase essential for cell proliferation.

== See also ==
- Oligosaccharyltransferase, TUSC3
