= STT3A, catalytic subunit of the oligosaccharyltransferase complex =

Protein-coding gene in the species Homo sapiens

STT3A

Identifiers
- Aliases: STT3A, ITM1, STT3-A, TMC, catalytic subunit of the oligosaccharyltransferase complex, STT3 oligosaccharyltransferase complex catalytic subunit A, CDG1WAR, CDG1WAD
- External IDs: OMIM: 601134; MGI: 105124; GeneCards: STT3A
Enzyme activity
EC #	BRENDA	ExPASy	KEGG	MetaCyc
2.4.99.18	↗	↗	↗	↗

Gene location (Human)
Chr.	Chromosome 11 (human)
Band	11q24.2	Start	125,591,712 bp
Band	11q24.2	End	125,625,215 bp

Gene location (Mouse)
Chr.	Chromosome 9 (mouse)
Band	9 A4|9 20.67 cM	Start	36,640,640 bp
Band	9 A4|9 20.67 cM	End	36,678,975 bp
RNA expression pattern
Bgee	Human / Mouse (ortholog); Top expressed in: stromal cell of endometrium; body of pancreas; islet of Langerhans; canal of the cervix; rectum; Achilles tendon; right ovary; epithelium of colon; ventricular zone; left ovary / Top expressed in: otic placode; cumulus cell; saccule; lacrimal gland; submandibular gland; gastrula; calvaria; seminal vesicula; yolk sac; molar; More reference expression data
BioGPS	n/a
Gene ontology
Molecular function	oligosaccharyl transferase activity; glycosyltransferase activity; protein binding; transferase activity; dolichyl-diphosphooligosaccharide-protein glycotransferase activity; metal ion binding
Cellular component	endoplasmic reticulum membrane; integral component of membrane; endoplasmic reticulum; oligosaccharyltransferase complex; membrane; oligosaccharyltransferase III complex
Biological process	co-translational protein modification; protein glycosylation; protein N-linked glycosylation via asparagine; post-translational protein modification
Sources:Amigo / QuickGO
Orthologs
Databases	NCBI: entry; OMA: entry
Species	Human	Mouse
Entrez	3703	16430
Ensembl	ENSG00000134910	ENSMUSG00000032116
UniProt	P46977	P46978
RefSeq (mRNA)	NM_001278503; NM_001278504; NM_152713	NM_008408
RefSeq (protein)	NP_001265432; NP_001265433; NP_689926	NP_032434
Location (UCSC)	Chr 11: 125.59 – 125.63 Mb	Chr 9: 36.64 – 36.68 Mb
PubMed search
- Wikidata
View/Edit Human	View/Edit Mouse

STT3A, catalytic subunit of the oligosaccharyltransferase complex is a protein that in humans is encoded by the STT3A gene.

== Function ==
The protein encoded by this gene is a catalytic subunit of the N-oligosaccharyltransferase (OST) complex, which functions in the endoplasmic reticulum to transfer glycan chains to asparagine residues of target proteins. A separate complex containing a similar catalytic subunit with an overlapping function also exists. Multiple transcript variants encoding different isoforms have been found for this gene. [provided by RefSeq, Aug 2015].

== See also ==
- Oligosaccharyltransferase, TUSC3
