= Paucimannosylation =

Post-translational modification

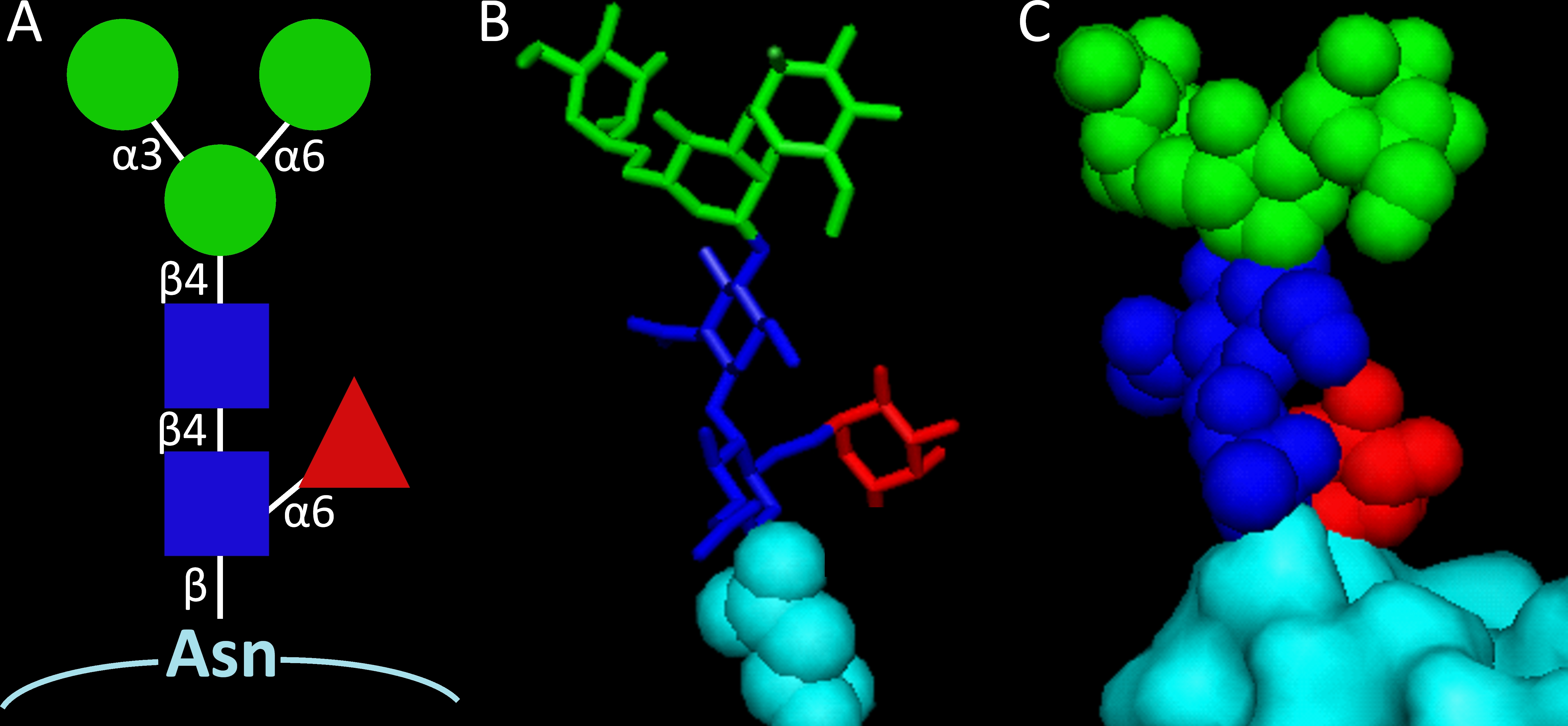
Representations of protein paucimannosylation, showing a common paucimannosidic glycan (M3F) attached to a protein. (A) Standard symbol nomenclature for the glycan. (B-C) Stick and space-filling models of the glycan attached to an asparagine (Asn) residue on a protein (turquoise). Monosaccharide color key: Red = fucose, Blue = N-acetylglucosamine, Green = mannose.

In biochemistry, paucimannosylation is a type of enzymatic post-translational modification that attaches simple carbohydrate chains (glycans) to proteins. These "paucimannosidic" glycans primarily contain mannose (Man) and N-Acetylglucosamine (GlcNAc), and may be further modified with other monosaccharides like fucose (Fuc) and xylose (Xyl), depending on the species and tissue. It is a distinct subtype of asparagine N-linked glycosylation, differing structurally and functionally from the well-established oligomannosidic-, hybrid-, and complex-type N-glycan classes.

Historically, paucimannosylation was considered a glycan modification characteristic of invertebrates and plants ("lower organisms"). However, recent studies have demonstrated its presence and functional importance in mammals, including in human immunity, cellular development, pathogen infection, and cancer. Paucimannosylation is now recognized as a distinct and evolutionarily widespread type of N-glycosylation that adds to the diversity of the glycoproteome across the eukaryotic domain.

== Etymology ==
The term "paucimannose" (occasionally spelled as "pauci-mannose") was coined in the early 1990s glycobiology literature. Paucimannose utilises the prefix "pauci" meaning few or small in Latin and the suffix "mannose" indicating glycans involving mannose-terminating glycans.

The phrases protein paucimannosylation and paucimannosidic proteins are commonly used in the literature to describe paucimannose-modified glycoproteins displaying intact structural and functional integrity. In contrast, the oligosaccharides themselves are often referred to as paucimannosidic, low mannose, and truncated glycans or other less conventional nomenclature.

A simple shorthand nomenclature has been proposed as a convenient way to name the individual paucimannosidic glycan structures, e.g. M3F denotes Man_{3}GlcNAc_{2}Fuc_{1}.

== Common paucimannosidic structural features across species, tissue and protein origin ==
Paucimannosidic glycans span the base composition Man_{1–3}GlcNAc_{2}. Additional modifications with Fuc, Xyl and/or Galactose (Gal) are common in mammals ref, plants and invertebrates, respectively. Paucimannosidic glycans expressed by insects and nematodes are particularly rich in structural diversity.

== Tissue expression and (sub-) cellular localisation ==
Paucimannosylation has been extensively studied and documented in insects, nematodes and plants over the past decades. The paucimannosidic proteins are constitutively and broadly expressed across tissues in these organisms under normal physiology. It is widely recognised that paucimannosylation is a central component of the glycoproteome in these "lower" organisms. Recently, paucimannosylation was reported to form an unconventional type of protein N-glycosylation in vertebrates. It has been proposed that "higher" species including humans, rodents and other mammals use paucimannosylation in a more tissue- and context-restricted manner in pathophysiological conditions including cancer, pathogen infection, inflammation and stemness.

=== Insects ===
Paucimannosidic glycans form the main component of the N-glycome of insects such as Drosophila melanogaster. Glycoprofiling of the venom component of the western honeybee, Apis mellifera, identified that paucimannosylation is a common modification of key proteins including hyaluronidase and phospholipase.

Insect cells lines are frequently utilised for recombinant expression of mammalian glycoproteins, which therefore are decorated with paucimannosidic glycans e.g. mouse interferon-β, human IgG_{1} and calf alkaline phosphatase.

=== Nematodes ===
The model organism Caenorhabditis elegans classified under the phylum Nematoda is amongst the most studied invertebrate species in glycobiology. The literature clearly documents a repertoire of nematodal paucimannosidic glycans. Another model nematode, Pristionchus pacificus, was also documented to express common nematodal paucimannosidic glycans.

Parasitic nematodes such as Haemonchus contortus have been reported to carry paucimannosidic glycans conjugated to an intestinal microsomal aminopeptidase. In addition, there have been reports documenting the expression of paucimannosidic glycans by others parasitic nematodes such as Ascaris suum, Heligmosomoides polygyrus and Trichuris suis.

=== Plants ===
Most plant species studied to date are recognised to constitutively express paucimannosidic N-glycoproteins. The paucimannosidic N-glycoproteins are abundantly expressed in the vacuoles of plants such as the legume seeds of Lotus japonicus, the rice seeds and leaves of Oryza sativa. Literature has provided evidence for plant-specific paucimannosidic glycan structures modified with Xyl and Fuc. Such structures are found across the broad Streptophyta (land plants) and Chlorophyta (green algae) clade and in diatoms such as Phaeodactylum tricornutum. Less reported bixylosylated paucimannosidic glycans have also been documented.

=== Vertebrates ===
Paucimannosidic proteins have been reported in vertebrates such as quail, chicken and in mammals, encompassing a limited diversity of paucimannosidic glycan structures. Early findings reported on paucimannosidic glycans on lysosomal glycoproteins in domestic animals. and human tissues, but have subsequently been found also to decorate non-lysosomal glycoproteins. Particularly, the granules of human neutrophils are a principal source of paucimannosidic proteins. Paucimannosidic proteins were also observed in human monocytes and macrophages and paucimannosidic immunoglycopeptides were found to be presented by SARS-CoV-2 challenged dendritic cells. Species within other classes under Animalia related to vertebrates were also documented to express paucimannosidic proteins. with some observations of unusual plant- and invertebrate-like paucimannosidic glycan structures

=== Fungi ===
Despite receiving considerable focus, the glycobiological literature do not contain evidence for the presence of paucimannosidic proteins within Fungi. Fungal species within this kingdom are therefore considered devoid of protein paucimannosylation and instead carry high mannosylated N-glycoproteins comprising extended and branched mannose-decorated antennae.

== Biosynthesis of paucimannosidic N-glycoproteins ==
=== Common aspects of the biosynthesis of paucimannosidic glycoproteins across species ===
Similar to other N-linked glycan types, the biosynthesis of paucimannosidic proteins across most species has been documented to be facilitated by the actions of a limited set of glyco-enzymes including beta-N-acetylhexosaminidases (Hex) and alpha-mannosidases, through GnT-I-dependent and -independent truncation pathways.

=== Insects ===
Studies on insect cell lines and in vivo experiments on D. melanogaster have revealed active expression of Hexo1 and Hexo2, and, most importantly, the fused lobe (fdl) gene encoding fused ß-lobe (FDL), also known as GNase, an orthologue of A. thaliana and human Hex. FDL is expressed in high abundance in vesicles and the plasma membrane and has, unlike Hexo1 and Hexo2, been linked to fruit fly paucimannosidic protein production. However, except for the well-studied D. melanogaster and other common insect model organisms, solid evidence for active involvement of Hex and/or the possible concerted usage of the GnT-I-independent pathway or alternative truncation pathways for paucimannosidic protein production remains unavailable across the diverse class of insects.

=== Nematodes ===
The model organism C. elegans is well studied; solid glycobiological literature have provided insights on the nematodal N-glycosylation machinery which shares many traits with other eukaryotic species. C. elegans is known to produce paucimannosidic proteins via a GnT-I-dependent route in which GnT-I firstly produces GlcNAc-capped glycoprotein intermediates. Further processing by two Hex isoenzymes (HEX-2 and HEX-3) encoded by two C. elegans genes (hex-2, hex-3) generate the unsubstituted C. elegans paucimannosidic glycans.

Other glycoenzymes catalise further processing and structural diversity including α-Man II and α1,6- and α1,3-fucosyltransferases. Albeit less active, a GnT-I-independent α1,6-fucosyltransferase has also been observed for C. elegans, indicating that both the GnT-I-dependent and -independent pathways may contribute to the formation of paucimannosidic N-glycoproteins in worms. However, the biosynthetic processes underpinning the unusual non-sugar and core-modified paucimannosidic N-glycans in C. elegans remain to be elucidated.

=== Plants ===
Hexosaminidases (Hex) are important glycoside hydrolases for the generation of plant-specific paucimannosidic proteins across Plantae. HEXO1-HEXO3 have been reported to be key mediators of paucimannose expression in various plant species including Nicotiana benthamiana, A.thaliana and L. japonicus. Moreover, α1,3-fucosyltransferase (FUT11/12) and β1,2-xylosyltransferase as well as α-mannosidase II were also reported to play critical roles in the generation of the paucimannosidic proteins expressed by plants.

=== Vertebrates ===
In humans, the Hex-mediated GnT-I-dependent truncation pathway is known to facilitate, at least in some tissues including neutrophils, the production of paucimannosidic proteins. Human Hex isoenzymes are assembled with alpha and beta subunits encoded by the HEXA and HEXB genes, respectively. From these two subunits, isoenzymes such as Hex A (one alpha and one beta subunit), Hex B (two beta subunits) and Hex S (two alpha subunits) are generated. Both Hex A and Hex B are reported to play important functional roles in human, particularly in the lysosomal degradation of gangliosides. Recently, both HEXA and HEXB were documented to mediate protein paucimannosylation in human neutrophils and may therefore also be the main driver for the elevated production of paucimannosidic proteins during cancer development. Recent in vitro observations have suggested other noncanonical truncation pathways with direct core fucosylation of paucimannosidic proteins in vertebrates, but this remains to be validated Hex A and Hex B isoenzymes are mainly present in the azurophilic granules of human neutrophils as a result of a proposed targeting-by-timing mechanism that supposedly directs these enzymes to this compartment during neutrophil development. Recently, granule-specific glycosylation was shown in neutrophils featuring prominent paucimannosylation in the azurophilic granules an observation that was suggested to arise from a "glycosylation-by-timing" mechanism yet to be documented. More widely across vertebrate species, the biosynthesis of paucimannosidic proteins remains largely unstudied.

== Functions of protein paucimannosylation ==
=== Human ===
The function of protein paucimannosylation remains largely unexplored in vertebrates. Recent literature however has emerged demonstrating that paucimannosylation play roles in mediating pathophysiological processes such as in inflammation, pathogen infection, cancer and in the development of stem cells and in normal homeostasis. For example, elevated expression of paucimannosidic proteins was shown in Mycobacterium tuberculosis infected macrophages, during preclampsia and on Tamm-Horsfall proteins secreted by human urothelial cells during urinary tract infections suggesting the involvement of paucimannosylation in those conditions. Additionally, sputum from individuals suffering from cystic fibrosis and airway infections were also observed to be rich in paucimannosidic proteins. Furthermore, paucimannosylation was reported to be prominent features of human neutrophils and in monocytes and macrophages. Recent literature have also demonstrated elevated signatures of paucimannosidic proteins associated with a range of human cancers including brain, breast, blood, melanoma, non-melanoma, liver, ovarian and prostate cancers. Enriched paucimannosidic glycoepitopes were found in the tumours when compared to the adjacent non-tumour tissues. Literature have also reported the presence of paucimannosylation in embryonic stem cells and neuronal stem cells, suggesting potential functional role(s) in these cells. Notably, deficiency of hexosaminidases results in clinically significant Tay-Sachs and Sandhoff diseases, which also implicates Hex and paucimannosidic proteins in those conditions.

Endogenous and exogenous binding partners of mammalian paucimannosidic glycans have been suggested, including the macrophage mannose receptor (CD206) and dectin-2. Other putative endogenous paucimannosidic protein receptors such as dectin-1, DC-SIGN and DC-SIGNR have been proposed, but experimental support is still lacking. Exogeneous binders of paucimannosidic glycans such as the Escherichia coli FimH and P. aeruginosa PA-IIL were also reported to play important roles in the adhesion and pathophysiology of these opportunistic pathogens.

=== Insects ===
In D. melanogaster, FDL-deficient mutants showed paucimannose-deficiency and, notably, caused locomotion defects in fruit flies, indicating that Hex and/or paucimannosidic proteins are involved, via elusive pathways, in essential fruit fly processes. As expected, the less-consequential monoallelic fdl mutation was shown to result in reduced paucimannosidic protein formation and caused a non-lethal, but still severe phenotype, by halting the generation of peripheral long-term memory neurons. Impaired generation of peripheral long-term memory neurons was also observed for fruit fly fdl and MgatI null mutations, which, in turn, resulted in infertility and locomotion defects. The lack of fucosylated paucimannosidic glycans was proposed to contribute to neuronal impairment in both fdl and Mgat1 mutants. The importance of fucosylated paucimannosidic glycans was supported by a study reporting that mutations in the FucT6 gene encoding the D. melanogaster α1,6-fucosyltransferase resulted in an impaired fruit fly immune response towards parasitic infections. Taken together, these phenotypic observations suggest that the fruit fly paucimannosidic glycans, some of which overlap with the human repertoire, are pivotal in the development, immune function and survival processes of D. melanogaster. It was reported that T. castaneum abundantly expresses paucimannosidic proteins during its post-larval stages, recapitulating findings from other studies proposing that paucimannosidic proteins are strongly regulated during early development. Thus, it is likely that paucimannosidic glycans conjugated to still unknown flour beetle carrier proteins, similar to those in nematodes and fruit flies, are vital for growth and survival processes of the flour beetle.

=== Nematodes ===
Expression of phosphocholine-modified and unsubstituted C. elegans paucimannosidic glycans is reportedly development stage-specific, implying important roles in nematodal development. In support, C. elegans hex-2 gene knock-out mutants displayed reduced paucimannosidic protein levels and altered sensitivity towards nematotoxic lectins relative to wild-type worms, a correlation suggesting involvement of paucimannosidic proteins in key C. elegans survival processes. Functionally, phosphocholine-containing paucimannosidic glycans were demonstrated to display immune-modulating roles in parasitic nematodes. Paucimannosidic glycans were suggested to play roles in the nematodal innate immune system by impacting the nematode's ability to fight and survive pathogenic bacteria
