= S-Acylation =

S-Acylation is the process of chemically linking a molecule to another molecule via a thioester bond. Protein S-acylation is a sub-type of S-acylation where the first of those molecules is a protein, and connected to the second through a cysteine amino acid. A prominent type of protein S-acylation is palmitoylation, which promotes lipid membrane association of the protein, for instance to the plasma membrane, Golgi apparatus, or inner nuclear membrane.
