= Dolichyl-diphosphooligosaccharide–protein glycotransferase =

Class of enzymes

dolichyl-diphosphooligosaccharide-protein glycotransferase

Identifiers
- EC no.: 2.4.99.18
- CAS no.: 75302-32-8

Databases
- BRENDA: enzyme data
- ExPASy: NiceZyme view
- KEGG: enzyme entry
- MetaCyc: metabolic pathway
- Rhea: reactions
- PDB structures: RCSB PDB PDBe PDBsum
- Gene Ontology: AmiGO / QuickGO
Search
- PMC: articles
- PubMed: articles
- NCBI: proteins

Oligosaccaryltransferase

Identifiers
- Symbol: ?
- InterPro: IPR018943
- OPM superfamily: 242
- OPM protein: 2lat
- Membranome: 275
Available protein structures:
- PDB: IPR018943
- AlphaFold: IPR018943

In enzymology, a dolichyl-diphosphooligosaccharide–protein glycotransferase (EC 2.4.99.18) is an enzyme that catalyzes the chemical reaction

dolichyl diphosphooligosaccharide + protein L-asparagine $\rightleftharpoons$ dolichyl diphosphate + a glycoprotein with the oligosaccharide chain attached by N-glycosyl linkage to protein L-asparagine

Thus, the two substrates of this enzyme are dolichyl diphosphooligosaccharide and protein L-asparagine, whereas its 3 products are dolichyl diphosphate, glycoprotein with the oligosaccharide chain attached by N-glycosyl, and linkage to protein L-asparagine.

This enzyme belongs to the family of glycosyltransferases, specifically the hexosyltransferases. The systematic name of this enzyme class is dolichyl-diphosphooligosaccharide:protein-L-asparagine oligopolysaccharidotransferase. Other names in common use include dolichyldiphosphooligosaccharide-protein glycosyltransferase, asparagine N-glycosyltransferase, dolichyldiphosphooligosaccharide-protein oligosaccharyltransferase, dolichylpyrophosphodiacetylchitobiose-protein glycosyltransferase, oligomannosyltransferase, oligosaccharide transferase, dolichyldiphosphoryloligosaccharide-protein, and oligosaccharyltransferase. This enzyme participates in n-glycan biosynthesis and glycan structures - biosynthesis 1.

== See also ==
- Oligosaccharyltransferase
