= Actinobacillus pleuropneumoniae =

Scientific classification
- Domain: Bacteria
- Kingdom: Pseudomonadati
- Phylum: Pseudomonadota
- Class: Gammaproteobacteria
- Order: Pasteurellales
- Family: Pasteurellaceae
- Genus: Actinobacillus
- Species: A. pleuropneumoniae

Binomial name
- Actinobacillus pleuropneumoniae (Pohl, 1983)

Species of bacterium

Actinobacillus pleuropneumoniae (previously Haemophilus pleuropneumoniae), is a Gram-negative, facultative anaerobic, respiratory pathogen found in pigs. It was first reported in 1957, and was formally declared to be the causative agent of porcine pleuropneumonia in 1964. It was reclassified in 1983 after DNA studies showed it was more closely related to A. lignieresii.

== Microbiology ==
Actinobacillus pleuropneumoniae is a nonmotile, Gram-negative, encapsulated coccobacillus bacterium found in the family Pasteurellaceae. It exhibits β-hemolysis activity, thus explaining its growth on chocolate or blood agar, but must be supplemented with NAD ('V factor') to facilitate growth for one of its biological variants (biovar 1). As a facultative anaerobic pathogen, A. pleuropneumoniae may need CO_{2} to grow. Depending on the biovar, the bacteria may or may not be positive for urease; both biovars are positive for porphyrin.

== Porcine pleuropneumonia ==
Actinobacillus pleuropneumoniae was found to be the causative agent for up to 20% of all bacterial pneumonia cases in swine. The main disease associated with this bacterium is porcine pleuropneumonia, a highly contagious respiratory disease, affecting primarily young pigs (usually less than 6 months). All of the symptoms and signs of porcine pleuropneumonia can be attributed to its virulence factors. The symptoms include respiratory distress, bloodstained discharge (usually frothy) from the mouth, fever, anorexia, mild diarrhea, cyanosis, lethargy, and spontaneous abortion in sows. The most common sign for a pig farmer is the sudden death of several pigs over a short period of time. Peak mortality is usually reached when pigs are 10–16 weeks old. Not uncommonly, mortality rates can reach 20-80% in fattening pigs, with similarly high morbidity. Pigs that do survive the disease remain as carriers and spread the bacterium to other swine. Several bacterial combinations are seen in vivo, the most common simultaneous infection being Pasteurella multocida. Treatment must be immediate and continuous. Antibiotics used include ceftiofur, tetracycline, synthetic penicillins, tylosin, and sulfonamides.

== Serotypes ==
Nineteen different serotype variants (serovars) have been recognized for A. pleuropneumoniae, based on the different capsular polysaccharides exhibited. Two different biovars exist, with biovar 1 having 13 different serovars and biovar 2 having two serovars. Differences in virulence potential, immunogenicity, and worldwide geographical distribution contribute to the diversity of the A. pleuropneumoniae serotypes. All 15 serotypes can cause disease, with one serotype usually predominating in a particular herd. The main difference between the serotypes is the expression of Apx toxins and other virulence factors.

== Pathophysiology ==
The bacterium rapidly colonizes the host and attaches to the epithelial cells of the tonsils, moving down to the respiratory tract using type IV fimbriae. As the bacteria replicate, they release cytotoxins (in the form of Apx toxins), hemolysins and the lipopolysaccharides (LPSs)on their outer membranes. The subsequent lysis of macrophages causes a release of lysozymes, which in turn cause the tissue damage seen in porcine pleuropneumonia. Members of the family Pasteurellaceae routinely change the cellular processes of the infected cell. In particular, A. pleuropneumoniae activates the creation of various cytokines such as interleukin 1β (IL-1β), IL-8, and tumor necrosis factor-alpha (TNF-α). IL-8 is itself a chemical signal used to attract neutrophils to the infection site.

The typical presentation of A. pleuropneumoniae in pigs is the characteristic demarcated lesions in the middle, cranial, and caudal lobes of the lungs. Areas of severe pneumonic growth are dark and consolidated. In the case of chronically infected pigs, pleural adhesions and abscesses are normally found. Histological studies of infected lung tissue normally showcase lung necrosis, neutrophil infiltration, macrophage and platelet activation, and an exudate. Severe hemolysis or hemorrhaging is also present.

Several virulence factors account for the remarkable pathogenicity of A. pleuropneumoniae. The more important ones include the production and release of the Apx toxins, the ability to produce a biofilm, its LPS layer, capsule polysaccharides, and its ability to survive within an iron-limited environment. Of these, the most important are its capsule and Apx toxin production.

The Apx toxin, a member of the RTX toxin family, is subdivided into four types: ApxI through ApxIV. As a pore-forming exotoxin, Apx toxin lyses alveolar epithelial cells, endothelial cells, red blood cells, neutrophils, and macrophages. Each serotype expresses different levels of the four Apx toxins. The most virulent combination known to exist, ApxI and ApxII, is expressed by serovars 1, 5, 9, and 11. The ApxII and ApxIII combination is of medium virulence and is expressed by serovars 2, 3, 4, 6, 8, and 15.

== Epidemiology ==
The bacteria are usually spread through direct nose-to-nose contact. It is species-specific, as its Apx toxin only affects pigs and other swine. Overcrowding in pigpens, co-infections of other respiratory pathogens, and unusual stress all contribute to the spread of the disease. A. pleuropneumoniae must have a host to survive, and does not survive for a significant time outside a host. This bacterium is found worldwide, with different serotypes prevailing in different locations. Serotypes 1, 3, 5, and 7 are most commonly found in North America.

== Economic impact ==
A. pleuropneumoniae has a profound economic impact on pork production and pig farmers. In 1995, Its infections cost the U.S. economy about $30 million. Such losses usually result from medication and veterinary expenses, increased mortality of pigs, extra labor, and other factors, such as reduced weight gain.
