= Undecaprenyl-diphosphooligosaccharide-protein glycotransferase =

Class of enzymes

Identifiers
- EC no.: 2.4.99.19

Databases
- IntEnz: IntEnz view
- BRENDA: BRENDA entry
- ExPASy: NiceZyme view
- KEGG: KEGG entry
- MetaCyc: metabolic pathway
- PRIAM: profile
- PDB structures: RCSB PDB PDBe PDBsum
Search
- PMC: articles
- PubMed: articles
- NCBI: proteins

Undecaprenyl-diphosphooligosaccharide-protein glycotransferase (EC 2.4.99.19, PglB) is an enzyme with systematic name tritrans,heptacis-undecaprenyl-diphosphooligosaccharide:protein-L-asparagine N-beta-D-oligosaccharidotransferase. This enzyme catalyses the following chemical reaction

tritrans,heptacis-undecaprenyl diphosphooligosaccharide + [protein]-L-asparagine $\rightleftharpoons$ tritrans,heptacis-undecaprenyl diphosphate + a glycoprotein with the oligosaccharide chain attached by N-beta-D-glycosyl linkage to protein L-asparagine

This is a bacterial enzyme that is isolated from Campylobacter jejuni and Campylobacter lari.
