= Oligosaccharyltransferase =

Class of enzymes

STT3
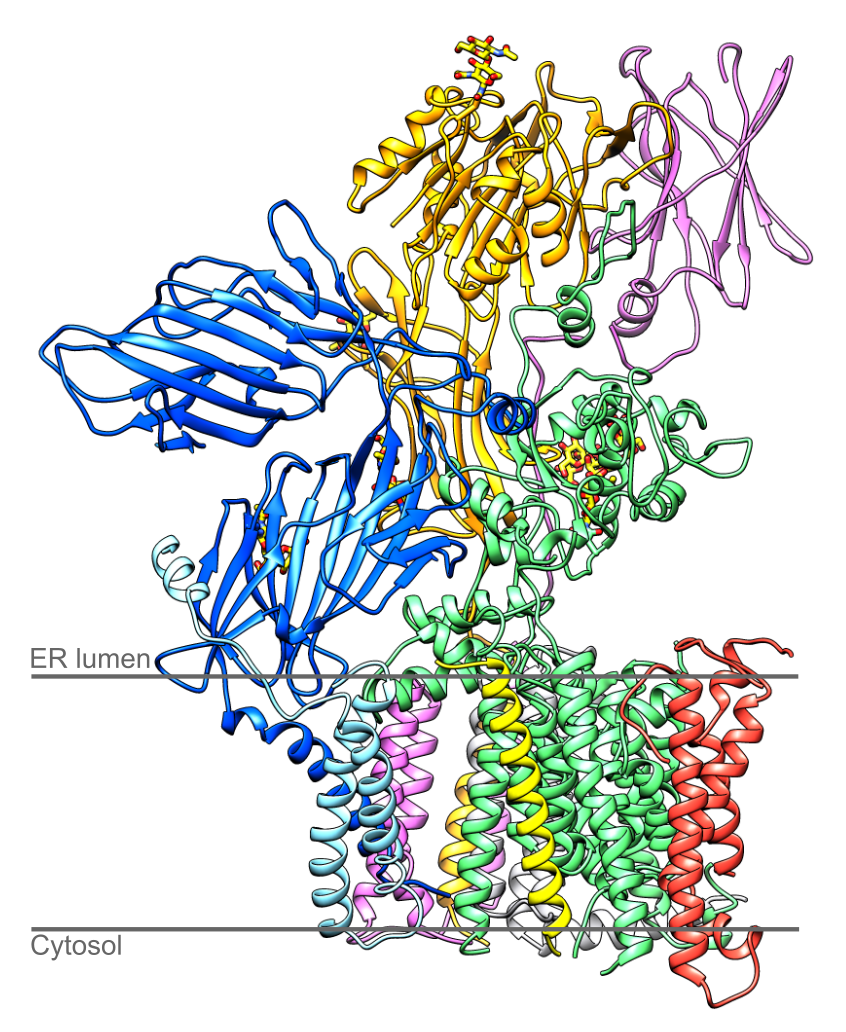
- Structure of yeast OST

Identifiers
- Symbol: STT3
- Pfam: PF02516
- Pfam clan: CL0111
- InterPro: IPR003674
- OPM superfamily: 242
- OPM protein: 3rce
- CAZy: GT66
- Membranome: 275
Available protein structures:
- PDB: IPR003674 PF02516 (ECOD; PDBsum)
- AlphaFold: IPR003674; PF02516

Oligosaccharyltransferase or OST (EC 2.4.1.119) is a membrane protein complex that transfers a 14-sugar oligosaccharide from dolichol to nascent protein. It is a type of glycosyltransferase. The sugar Glc_{3}Man_{9}GlcNAc_{2} (where Glc=Glucose, Man=Mannose, and GlcNAc=N-acetylglucosamine) is attached to an asparagine (Asn) residue in the sequence Asn-X-Ser or Asn-X-Thr where X is any amino acid except proline. This sequence is called a glycosylation sequon. The reaction catalyzed by OST is the central step in the N-linked glycosylation pathway.

== Location ==
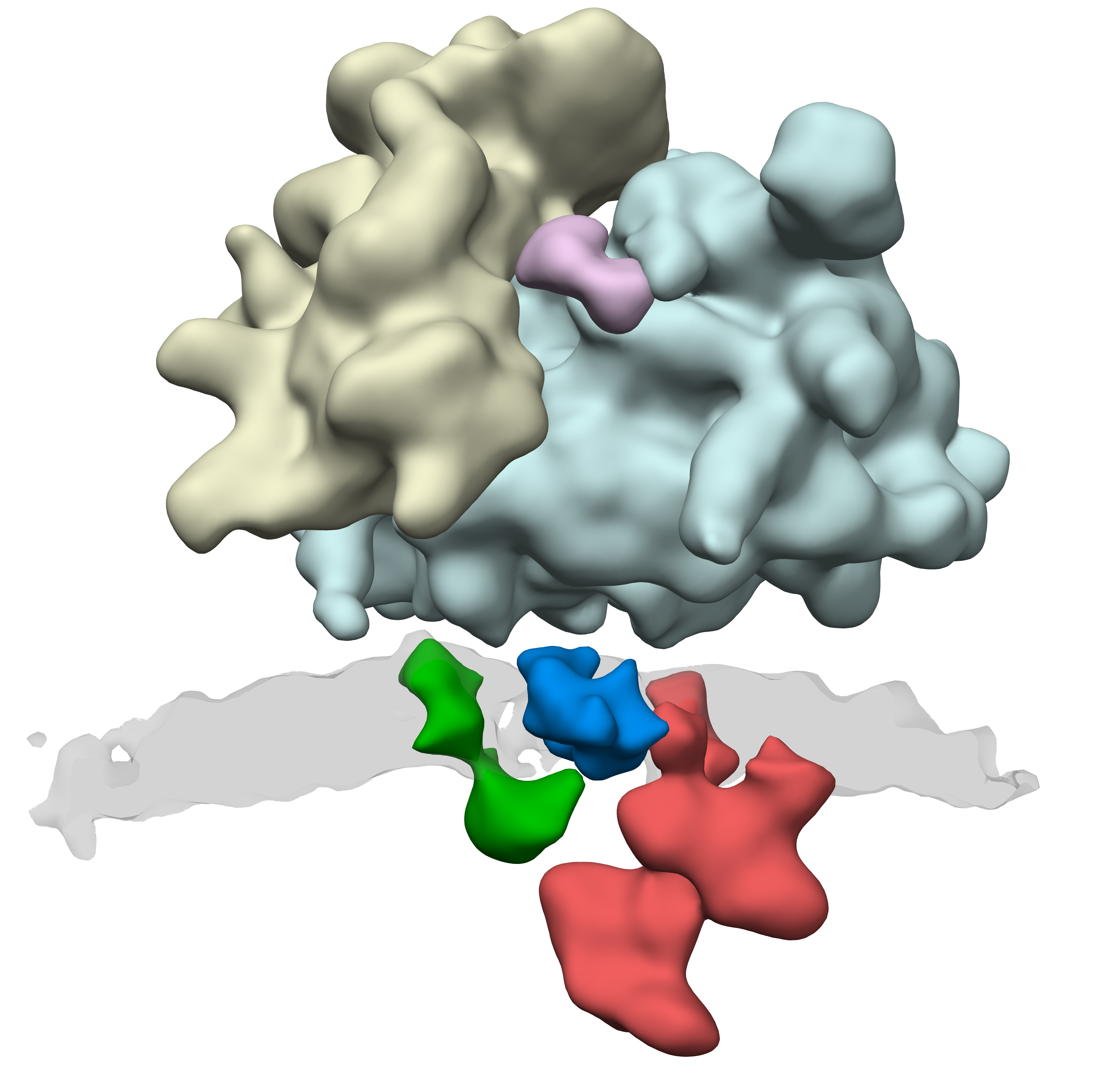
ER Translocon complex. Many protein complexes are involved in protein synthesis. The actual production takes place in the ribosomes (grey and light blue). Through the ER translocon (green: Sec61, blue: TRAP complex, and red: oligosaccharyl transferase complex) the newly synthesized protein is transported across the membrane (gray) into the interior of the ER. Sec61 is the protein-conducting channel and the OST adds sugar moieties to the nascent protein.

OST is a component of the translocon in the endoplasmic reticulum (ER) membrane. A lipid-linked core-oligosaccharide is assembled at the membrane of the endoplasmic reticulum and transferred to selected asparagine residues of nascent polypeptide chains by the oligosaccharyl transferase complex. The active site of OST is located about 4 nm from the lumenal face of the ER membrane.

It usually acts during translation as the nascent protein is entering the ER, but this cotranslational glycosylation is nevertheless called a posttranslational modification. A few examples have been found of OST activity after translation is complete. Current opinion is that post-translational activity may occur if the protein is poorly folded or folds slowly.

== Structure and function ==
Yeast OST is composed of eight different membrane-spanning proteins in three subcomplexes (one of them is OST4). These octomers do not form higher order oligomers, and three of the eight proteins are glycosylated themselves. OST in mammals is known to have a similar composition.

OST is thought to require many subunits because it must:

1. Position itself near the translocon pore.
2. Recognize and bind oligosaccharyldolichol.
3. Scan the nascent protein in order to recognize and bind sequons.
4. Move these two large substrates into their proper locations and conformations.
5. Activate the Asn amide nitrogen atom for the actual transfer of oligosaccharide.
6. Release its substrates.

The catalytically active subunit of the OST is called STT3. Two paralogs exist in eukaryotes, termed STT3A and STT3B. STT3A is primarily responsible for cotranslational glycosylation of the nascent polypeptide as it enters the lumen of the endoplasmic reticulum whereas STT3B can also mediate posttranslational glycosylation. The structure of PglB, the prokaryotic homolog of STT3 has been solved. The high sequence similarity between the prokaryotic and the eukaryotic STT3 suggests that their structures are similar.

== Clinical significance ==
CDG syndromes are genetic disorders of the glycosylation pathway. They are labelled "Type I" if the defective gene is for an enzyme involved in the assembly or transfer of the Glc_{3}Man_{9}GlcNAc_{2}-dolichol precursor. They are labelled "Type II" if the defective step occurs after the action of OST in the N-linked glycosylation pathway or involves O-linked glycosylation.

== See also ==
- STT3A
- STT3B
