= Sequon =

Sequence of consecutive amino acids in a protein

A sequon is a sequence of consecutive amino acids in a protein that can serve as the attachment site to a polysaccharide, frequently an N-linked-Glycan. The polysaccharide is linked to the protein via the nitrogen atom in the side chain of asparagine (Asn). The sequon for N-glycosylation is either Asn-X-Ser or Asn-X-Thr, where X is any amino acid except proline, Ser denoting serine and Thr threonine. Occasionally, other amino acids can take the place of Ser and Thr, such as in the leukocyte surface protein (CD69), where the amino acid sequence Asn-X-Cys is an acceptable sequon for the addition of N-linked glycans.
