= Novel coronavirus =

Provisional name given to any recently discovered coronavirus of medical significance

Novel coronavirus (nCoV) is a provisional name given to coronaviruses of medical significance before a permanent name is decided upon. Although coronaviruses are endemic in humans and infections normally mild, such as the common cold (caused by human coronaviruses in ~15% of cases), cross-species transmission has produced some unusually virulent strains which can cause viral pneumonia and in serious cases even acute respiratory distress syndrome and death.

== Species ==
The following viruses could initially be referred to as "novel coronavirus", before being formally named:

Human pathogenic novel coronaviridae species
| Official name | Other names | Original host (Note: Host jump capability may not persist) | Place of discovery | Disease caused |
|---|---|---|---|---|
| Severe acute respiratory syndrome coronavirus 2 (SARS-CoV-2) (Note: This virus is not a distinct species, but rather a strain of the species SARSr-CoV) | (2019) novel coronavirus (nCoV); SARS virus 2; Human coronavirus 2019 (HCoV-19) | pangolins, bats | Wuhan, China | coronavirus disease 2019 (COVID-19) (Note: Synonyms include 2019 coronavirus pneumonia and Wuhan respiratory syndrome) |
| Middle East respiratory syndrome–related coronavirus (MERS-CoV) (Note: Strains include MERS coronavirus EMC/2012 and London1 novel CoV/2012) | (2012) novel coronavirus; MERS virus; Middle East virus; camel flu virus | camels, bats | Jeddah, Saudi Arabia | Middle East respiratory syndrome (MERS) |
| Human coronavirus HKU1 (HCoV-HKU1) | (2004) novel coronavirus; New Haven virus | mice | Hong Kong, China | unnamed, extremely rare, usually mild variant of coronavirus respiratory syndrome |
| Severe acute respiratory syndrome coronavirus 1 (SARS-CoV-1) | (2002) novel coronavirus; SARS virus | civets, bats | Foshan, China | severe acute respiratory syndrome (SARS) |

All four viruses are part of the Betacoronavirus genus within the coronavirus family.

== Etymology ==
The word "novel" indicates a "new pathogen of a previously known type" (i.e. known family) of virus. Use of the word conforms to best practices for naming new infectious diseases published by the World Health Organization (WHO) in 2015. Historically, diseases have sometimes been named after locations, individuals, or specific species. However, this practice is now explicitly discouraged by the WHO.

The official permanent names for viruses and for diseases are determined by the ICTV and the WHO's ICD, respectively.

At the beginning of the COVID-19 pandemic in Hubei a 2020 study from the University of Alabama at Birmingham found a more than ten-fold increase in use of expressions such as "Chinese virus" or "Wu flu virus" on Twitter compared to before the outbreak. The researchers voiced concerns whether such terminology could hinder public health efforts or be stigmatizing. No such effects were observed in the wake of the MERS outbreaks being referred to as "Camel flu virus" or "Middle East virus".

== See also ==
- Coronavirus
- Coronavirus diseases
- Coronavirus 229E
- Coronavirus OC43
- Coronavirus NL63
- Bat SARS-like coronavirus WIV1
- Bat-borne viruses
