= London1 novel CoV/2012 =

London1_novel CoV/2012

Virus classification
- (unranked): Virus
- Realm: Riboviria
- Kingdom: Orthornavirae
- Phylum: Pisuviricota
- Class: Pisoniviricetes
- Order: Nidovirales
- Family: Coronaviridae
- Genus: Betacoronavirus
- Subgenus: Merbecovirus
- Species: Betacoronavirus cameli
- Strain: London1_novel CoV/2012

Strain of virus

London1_novel CoV/2012 is a coronavirus strain isolated from a Qatari man in London in 2012 who was one of the first patients to come down with what has since been named Middle East respiratory syndrome-related coronavirus (MERS-CoV). The Qatari patient had traveled to Saudi Arabia from Qatar. He returned to Qatar, but when he fell ill, he traveled to London for treatment. The United Kingdom's Health Protection Agency (HPA) named the virus.

== Virology ==
Phylogenetic analysis demonstrated that London1 is a Betacoronavirus with a close relationship to Tylonycteris bat coronavirus HKU4 and Pipistrellus bat coronavirus HKU5. It was found that the virus nucleic acid fragment identified in the isolate from the Qatari-London patient is derived from a coronavirus that was distinct from all coronaviruses previously identified.

== See also ==
- MERS coronavirus EMC/2012 – Strain of Middle East respiratory syndrome-related coronavirus
- Novel virus – Infectious agent that replicates in cells
