= Marylyn Addo =

German virologist (born 1970)

Marylyn Martina Addo
- Born: Troisdorf
- Education: Humboldt University of Berlin (PhD) University of Bonn; London School of Hygiene and Tropical Medicine; Harvard Medical School
- Scientific career
- Institutions: German Center for Infection Research
- Thesis: Transmission of oral Candida albicans strains between HIV-positive patients (1999)

Marylyn Martina Addo (German: [ˈmɛʁilɪn ˈa.doː], born 1970) is a German infectiologist who is a professor and the German Center for Infection Research (DZIF) head of infectious disease at the University Medical Center Hamburg-Eppendorf. Addo has developed and tested vaccinations that protect people from Ebola virus disease and the MERS coronavirus EMC/2012. She is currently developing a viral vector-based COVID-19 vaccine.

== Early life and education ==
Addo is the daughter of a Ghanaian father and a German mother, and she was born in Bonn. Her father is a physician. Addo studied medicine at the University of Bonn. She earned her diploma at the London School of Hygiene and Tropical Medicine, during which she researched Candida albicans transmission between HIV-positive people. In 1999, she moved to Boston, where she specialised in infectious diseases at Harvard Medical School.

== Research and career ==
Whilst at Harvard University, Addo was made an assistant professor at the Ragon Institute, and served as associate director of the Harvard University Center for AIDS Research. Here she investigated the role of Indoleamine 2,3-dioxygenase (IDO) specific T cells as immune system regulators in patients with HIV-1.

In 2013, Addo returned to Germany, where she was made a professor and the German Center for Infection Research (DZIF) head of infectious disease at the University Medical Center Hamburg-Eppendorf. Here she works on infectious diseases and tropical medicine. Her research group work on clinical management, epidemiology and the immunology of newly emerging infections. In 2014, Addo was involved with the development of the preparation RVSV-EBOV, an experimental recombinant live vaccination that can be used against Ebola virus disease. The vaccine is vector-based, where the DNA of a virus is introduced into human cells via a different virus. To be effective the vaccination must contain parts of the virus that human cells can generate antibodies against. As a result, vector-based vaccinations can result in robust immune responses. The RVSV-EBOV vaccination contained a modified Vesicular-Stomatitis-Virus, which contained a surface protein of Ebola virus. After making contact with the ebola glycoprotein, the vaccination produce antibodies, T cells and neurotransmitters. It was selected by the World Health Organization for accelerated testing. Of her time working on the Ebola virus, Addo has said "During such a disaster, the world comes together."

Alongside the ebola vaccination, Addo worked on a recombinant live vaccination to tackle the Middle East Respiratory syndrome (MERS) vaccination. Her vaccination was supported by the Coalition for Epidemic Preparedness Innovations. The MERS Virus vaccine was tested in camels, the animals which first spread MERS coronavirus EMC/2012, in 2016, and started clinical trials in humans from 2018.

In 2020, Addo started developing a vector-based vaccination to protect people from the COVID-19 pandemic. Inside the coronavirus there is a spike protein that can penetrate human cells. Addo looks to combine the spike protein with the genetic information of another viral vector that can penetrates cells and can produce spike proteins. The immune system recognises that these proteins are foreign bodies, triggering an immune response and a spike in T cells that ultimately work against the coronavirus protein. The proposed vaccine makes use of the smallpox virus (modified vaccinia Ankara) as a vehicle for the COVID-19 vaccine. The vaccination will be developed by IDT Biologika.

== Recognition ==
Addo was nominated by the Social Democratic Party as delegate to the Federal Convention for the purpose of electing the President of Germany in 2022.

=== Awards ===
- 1999 London School of Hygiene & Tropical Medicine Ralph A. Neal Memorial Prize
- 2008: Edward H. Kass Award for Clinical Excellence, Massachusetts ID Society
- 2013: Honorary Professor, University of KwaZulu-Natal, Durban, South Africa
- 2019: Pettenkofer Prize

== Selected publications ==
- Leslie, A. J.; Pfafferott, K. J.; Chetty, P.; Draenert, R.; Addo, M. M.; Feeney, M.; Tang, Y.; Holmes, E. C.; Allen, T.; Prado, J. G.; Altfeld, M. (2004). "HIV evolution: CTL escape mutation and reversion after transmission". Nature Medicine. 10 (3): 282–289. doi:10.1038/nm992. ISSN 1546-170X. PMID 14770175. S2CID 28756735.
- Kiepiela, Photini; Leslie, Alasdair J.; Honeyborne, Isobella; Ramduth, Danni; Thobakgale, Christina; Chetty, Senica; Rathnavalu, Prinisha; Moore, Corey; Pfafferott, Katja J.; Hilton, Louise; Zimbwa, Peter (2004-12-09). "Dominant influence of HLA-B in mediating the potential co-evolution of HIV and HLA". Nature. 432 (7018): 769–775. Bibcode:2004Natur.432..769K. doi:10.1038/nature03113. ISSN 1476-4687. PMID 15592417. S2CID 4327272.
- Altfeld, Marcus; Addo, Marylyn M.; Rosenberg, Eric S.; Hecht, Frederick M.; Lee, Paul K.; Vogel, Martin; Yu, Xu G.; Draenert, Rika; Johnston, Mary N.; Strick, Daryld; Allen, Todd M. (2003-12-05). "Influence of HLA-B57 on clinical presentation and viral control during acute HIV-1 infection". AIDS. 17 (18): 2581–2591. doi:10.1097/00002030-200312050-00005. ISSN 0269-9370. PMID 14685052. S2CID 2839546.

== Personal life ==
Addo is married and has two children.
