= Tylonycteris bat coronavirus HKU4 =

Virus classification
- (unranked): Virus
- Realm: Riboviria
- Kingdom: Orthornavirae
- Phylum: Pisuviricota
- Class: Pisoniviricetes
- Order: Nidovirales
- Family: Coronaviridae
- Genus: Betacoronavirus
- Subgenus: Merbecovirus
- Species: Betacoronavirus tylonycteridis

Species of virus

Tylonycteris bat coronavirus HKU4 (Bat-CoV HKU4) is an enveloped, positive-sense single-stranded RNA virus mammalian Group 2 Betacoronavirus that has been found to be genetically related to the Middle East respiratory syndrome-related coronavirus (MERS-CoV) that is responsible for the 2012 Middle East respiratory syndrome coronavirus outbreak in Saudi Arabia, Jordan, United Arab Emirates, the United Kingdom, France, and Italy.

== Transmission ==
The exact means of transmission to humans is not yet well known. However, it has been demonstrated that betaCoV's including HKU4 have the propensity to recombine and cause interspecies transmission. However, this is not seen in Group C betaCov's to which MERS-CoV is most closely related.

== See also ==
- Severe acute respiratory syndrome (SARS)
- Tylonycteris
- Pipistrellus
- Human coronavirus HKU1
- Human coronavirus OC43
- Pipistrellus bat coronavirus HKU5
- RNA virus
- Positive/negative-sense
- London1 novel CoV/2012
