= Hedgehog coronavirus 1 =

Virus classification
- (unranked): Virus
- Realm: Riboviria
- Kingdom: Orthornavirae
- Phylum: Pisuviricota
- Class: Pisoniviricetes
- Order: Nidovirales
- Family: Coronaviridae
- Genus: Betacoronavirus
- Subgenus: Merbecovirus
- Species: Betacoronavirus erinacei

Species of virus

Hedgehog coronavirus 1 is a Betacoronavirus lineage C virus or merbecovirus, a positive-sense RNA virus, originally discovered in European hedgehogs (Erinaceus europaeus) from Germany and first described in 2014.

== Discovery ==
Most Betacoronavirus clade c viruses are known from bats. The hedgehog is in the animal order Eulipotyphla, which is phylogenetically related to the bats, Chiroptera, so researchers investigated wild hedgehogs to look for coronaviruses. Hedgehog merbecoviruses have been reported in high abundance in Germany, UK, Italy, France, Poland, Russia, Portugal, and China. Since their discovery, hedgehog merbecoviruses have been collectively referred to as "ErinCoVs," or "EriCoVs."

== Shedding ==
Seroprevalence is high for hedgehog merbecoviruses, with more than 50% of samples testing positive in many studies. No obvious pathology has been reported in infected hedgehogs, suggesting asyptomatic infection. Virus was found in the highest concentrations in the lower gastrointestinal tract and viral shedding has been reported to last for up to 60 days.

== Molecular Virology ==
All ErinCoVs discovered so far, in Europe and Asia, have been found to utilize "aminopeptidase N" as a cell entry receptor.

== See also ==
- Animal viruses
- MERS-CoV
