= MK-7845 =

Antiviral drug

Clinical data
- Other names: HY-157778
- Routes of administration: By mouth

Identifiers
- IUPAC name: methyl N-[(2S)-1-[(3S,3aS,6aR)-3-[[(3S)-6,6-difluoro-1-(methylamino)-1,2-dioxoheptan-3-yl]carbamoyl]-3,3a,4,5,6,6a-hexahydro-1H-cyclopenta[c]pyrrol-2-yl]-3,3-dimethyl-1-oxobutan-2-yl]carbamate
- CAS Number: 2952554-69-5
- PubChem CID: 168976112

Chemical and physical data
- Formula: C_{24}H_{38}F_{2}N_{4}O_{6}
- Molar mass: 516.587 g·mol^{−1}
- 3D model (JSmol): Interactive image
- SMILES: CC(C)(C)[C@@H](C(=O)N1C[C@@H]2CCC[C@@H]2[C@H]1C(=O)N[C@@H](CCC(C)(F)F)C(=O)C(=O)NC)NC(=O)OC
- InChI: InChI=1S/C29H36N6O2/c1-7-35-11-10-28(32-35)24-15-22(14-23(16-24)25-18-30-34(6)19-25)21(3)31-29(36)27-17-26(9-8-20(27)2)37-13-12-33(4)5/h8-11,14-19,21H,7,12-13H2,1-6H3,(H,31,36)/t21-/m1/s1; Key:DAVWSCGJIBGBHZ-IQWQSGHPSA-N

MK-7845 is an experimental antiviral medication being studied as a potential treatment for COVID-19. It is believed to work by inhibiting SARS-CoV-2 main protease (3CL^{pro}), a crucial enzyme for viral replication.

== Mechanism of action ==
MK-7845 functions as a reversible covalent inhibitor of the SARS-CoV-2 main protease (also known as 3CL^{pro} or M^{pro}). This viral protease enzyme is critical for cleaving viral polyproteins into functional viral proteins necessary for viral replication. The unique cleavage site recognized by 3CL^{pro} features a glutamine residue at the P1 position that is not utilized by human proteases, making it an attractive target for drug development. Unlike other covalent inhibitors that typically utilize an amide group as a glutamine mimic at this position, MK-7845 incorporates a difluorobutyl substituent. Research demonstrates that this modification interacts with the protease's His163 residue, a crucial component for the binding and inhibition of the enzyme.

== Research ==
In vitro studies have demonstrated that MK-7845 exhibits nanomolar potency against a broad spectrum of clinical subvariants of SARS-CoV-2 as well as Middle East respiratory syndrome coronavirus (MERS-CoV). In vivo studies on transgenic mouse models, specifically K18-hACE2 mice (which express human ACE2 receptors) infected with SARS-CoV-2 and K18-hDDP4 mice infected with MERS-CoV, showed that giving MK-7845 by mouth significantly decreased the amount of virus in the lungs, by more than 6 log orders. Additionally, a study also observed that MK-7845 may offer prophylactic protection to mice when administered prior to exposure to the coronaviruses tested.

A process was developed to enable kilogram-scale production of MK-7845 in accordance with good manufacturing practices (GMPs). The production process was optimized to yield drug quantities suitable for safety studies and phase 1 clinical trials.
