= CCDC144A =

Protein-coding gene in humans

Identifiers
- Aliases: CCDC144A, coiled-coil domain containing 144A
- External IDs: GeneCards: CCDC144A

Gene location (Human)
Chr.	Chromosome 17 (human)
Band	17p11.2	Start	16,689,537 bp
Band	17p11.2	End	16,777,881 bp
RNA expression pattern
Bgee	Human / Mouse (ortholog); Top expressed in: testicle; gonad; sural nerve; bone marrow cell; Achilles tendon; epithelium of colon; right hemisphere of cerebellum; corpus callosum; right lung; left testis / n/a; More reference expression data
BioGPS	n/a
Orthologs
Databases	NCBI: entry; OMA: entry
Species	Human	Mouse
Entrez	9720	n/a
Ensembl	ENSG00000170160	n/a
UniProt	A2RUR9	n/a
RefSeq (mRNA)	NM_014695; NM_001382000	n/a
RefSeq (protein)	NP_055510; NP_001368929	n/a
Location (UCSC)	Chr 17: 16.69 – 16.78 Mb	n/a
PubMed search		n/a
- Wikidata
View/Edit Human

Coiled-coil domain-containing protein 144A is a protein that in humans is encoded by the CCDC144A gene (previously KIAA0565). There are four members of the CCDC144 family: CCDC144A, and the apparently non-functional pseudogenes CCDC144BP, CCDC144CP, and CCDC144NL.

== Gene ==
This gene has a nucleotide sequence that is 5140 bp long, and it encodes 641 amino acids. It is found on the short arm, plus (forward) strand of chromosome 17 at p11.2. The mRNA for the CCDC144A gene has 3 alternative splicing isoforms named A2RUR9-1, A2RUR9-2, AND A2RUR9-3, but there is no experimental confirmation available yet.

== Protein ==
This protein for this gene is also known as coiled coil domain containing 144A (CCDC144A) protein. It consists of 641 amino acids. This protein weighs 75.8 kDa and has an isoelectric point of 6.357. This protein localizes near the nucleus, and is a soluble protein with a hydrophobicity of -1.021842. This protein is also non-secretory and has 10 potential serine and 3 potential threonine phosphorylation sites. There are no tyrosine sulfation sites, but there are a few potential sumoylation sites on this protein. Also, this protein is predicted to be non-myristoylated and does not contain a signal peptide.

=== Structure ===
This protein has a domain of unknown function (DUF) 3496, which has been conserved in eukaryotes. The DUF3496 domain is found from amino acids 547-622. CCDC144A, an alias of this gene, indicates that there should be a coiled coil domain within the protein. Coiled coils are structural motifs in proteins in which 2 more alpha helices are coiled together, and they usually contain a heptad repeat, hxxhcxc, or hydrophobic (h) and charge (c) amino acid residues. The 5' and 3' untranslated regions of the nucleotide sequence of this gene are rich in stem-loop structures. In place of a coiled coil, a leucine zipper was found. Residues from 478-499, "LHNTRDALGRESLILERVQRDL", are the residues that form the leucine zipper pattern. The structure of this protein consists of mostly alpha helices, with some random coils.

== Evolution ==
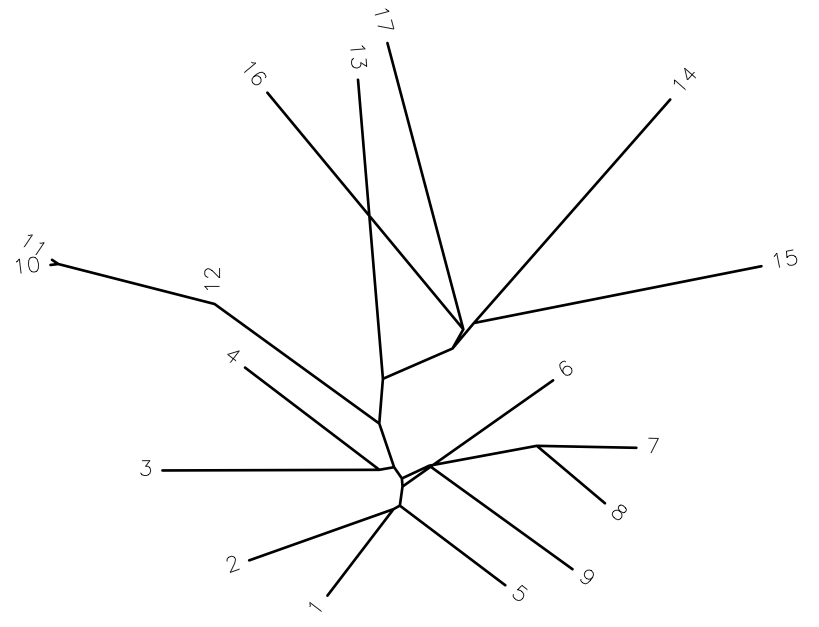
Phylogenetic tree displaying orthologs of CCDC144A.

Number	Species
1	Nine-banded armadillo
2	Cow
3	Flying fox
4	Mouse eared bat
5	Chimpanzee
6	Treeshrew
7	House mouse
8	Chinese hamster
9	Naked mole rat
10	Rhesus monkey
11	Crab-eating macaque
12	Human KIAA0565
13	Platypus
14	Western clawed frog
15	Pufferfish
16	Carolina anole
17	Zebra finch

Orthologs of KIAA0565 protein have been identified mostly in mammals, but some birds, reptiles, amphibians, and fish as well.

=== Potential Orthologs ===
Protein name	Genus and species	Common name	Ortholog space	Query cover (%)	Max identity (%)	Accession number
CCDC 144A	Macaca fasicularis	Crab-eating macaque	0	97	86	EHH57800.1
CCDC 144A, Partial	Macaca mulatta	Rhesus monkey	0	97	86	EHH24608.1
ANKRD 26	Pan troglodytes	Common chimpanzee	2e-160	96	67	JAA07196.1
ANKRD 26, Predicted	Dasypus novemcinctus	Nine-banded armadillo	1e-158	96	65	XP_004470808.1
ANKRD 26	Myotis davidii	Mouse eared bat	2e-154	96	64	ELK35935.1
ANKRD 26	Bos taurus	Cow	2e-157	96	63	NP_001107239.1
ANKRD 26	Tupaia chinensis	Treeshrew	3e-147	96	62	ELW73004.1
ANKRD 26	Cricetulus griseus	Chinese hamster	1e-145	96	60	EGW08323.1
ANKRD 26	Heterocephalus glaber	Naked mole rat	2e-138	96	59	EHB01988.1
ANKRD 26	Mus musculus	House mouse	4e-141	96	57	NP_001074581.1
ANKRD 26, Partial	Pteropus alecto	Black flying fox	2e-171	97	51	ELK03279.1
ANKRD 26-Like, Predicted	Ornithorhynchus anatinus	Platypus	2e-108	96	51	XP_001509663.2
ANKRD 26-Like, Predicted	Taeniopygia guttata	Zebra finch	3e-88	92	45	XP_004177264.1
ANKRD 26-Like, Predicted	Anolis carolinensis	Carolina anole	2e-75	97	44	XP_003221333.1
ANKRD 26, Predicted	Xenopus tropicalis	Western clawed frog	2e-78	98	44	XP_002935004.1
Unnamed Protein Product	Tetraodon nigroviridis	Pufferfish	1e-28	98	34	CAF98417.1

== Clinical significance ==
This gene has been linked to Smith-Magenis Syndrome (SMS), which is also known as chromosome 17p11.2 deletion syndrome, chromosome 17p deletion syndrome, deletion 17p syndrome, partial monosomy 17p, and deletion abnormality.

=== Interacting proteins ===
There may potentially be two proteins that interact with KIAA0565, and they are ubiquitin specific peptidase 32 (USP32) and ubiquitin specific peptidase 25 (USP25).

=== Expression ===
This protein has been shown to have relatively low expression in all tissues.
