= Rousettus bat coronavirus GCCDC1 =

Virus classification
- (unranked): Virus
- Realm: Riboviria
- Kingdom: Orthornavirae
- Phylum: Pisuviricota
- Class: Pisoniviricetes
- Order: Nidovirales
- Family: Coronaviridae
- Genus: Betacoronavirus
- Subgenus: Nobecovirus
- Species: Betacoronavirus cororeum

Species of virus

Rousettus bat coronavirus GCCDC1 is a species of coronavirus in the genus Betacoronavirus.
