= Nobecovirus =

Virus classification
- (unranked): Virus
- Realm: Riboviria
- Kingdom: Orthornavirae
- Phylum: Pisuviricota
- Class: Pisoniviricetes
- Order: Nidovirales
- Family: Coronaviridae
- Genus: Betacoronavirus
- Subgenus: Nobecovirus

Subgenus of viruses

Nobecovirus is a subgenus of viruses in the genus Betacoronavirus. The viruses in the group were previously known as group 2d coronaviruses.

== Taxonomy ==
The subgenus contains the following species, listed by scientific name and followed by the exemplar virus of the species:

- Betacoronavirus cororeum, Rousettus bat coronavirus GCCDC1
- Betacoronavirus eidoli, Eidolon helvum bat coronavirus CMR704-P12
- Betacoronavirus rousetti, Rousettus bat coronavirus HKU9

== Structure ==
The viruses of this subgenus, like other coronaviruses, have a lipid bilayer envelope in which the membrane (M), envelope (E) and spike (S) structural proteins are anchored.

== See also ==
- Embecovirus (group 2a)
- Sarbecovirus (group 2b)
- Merbecovirus (group 2c)
