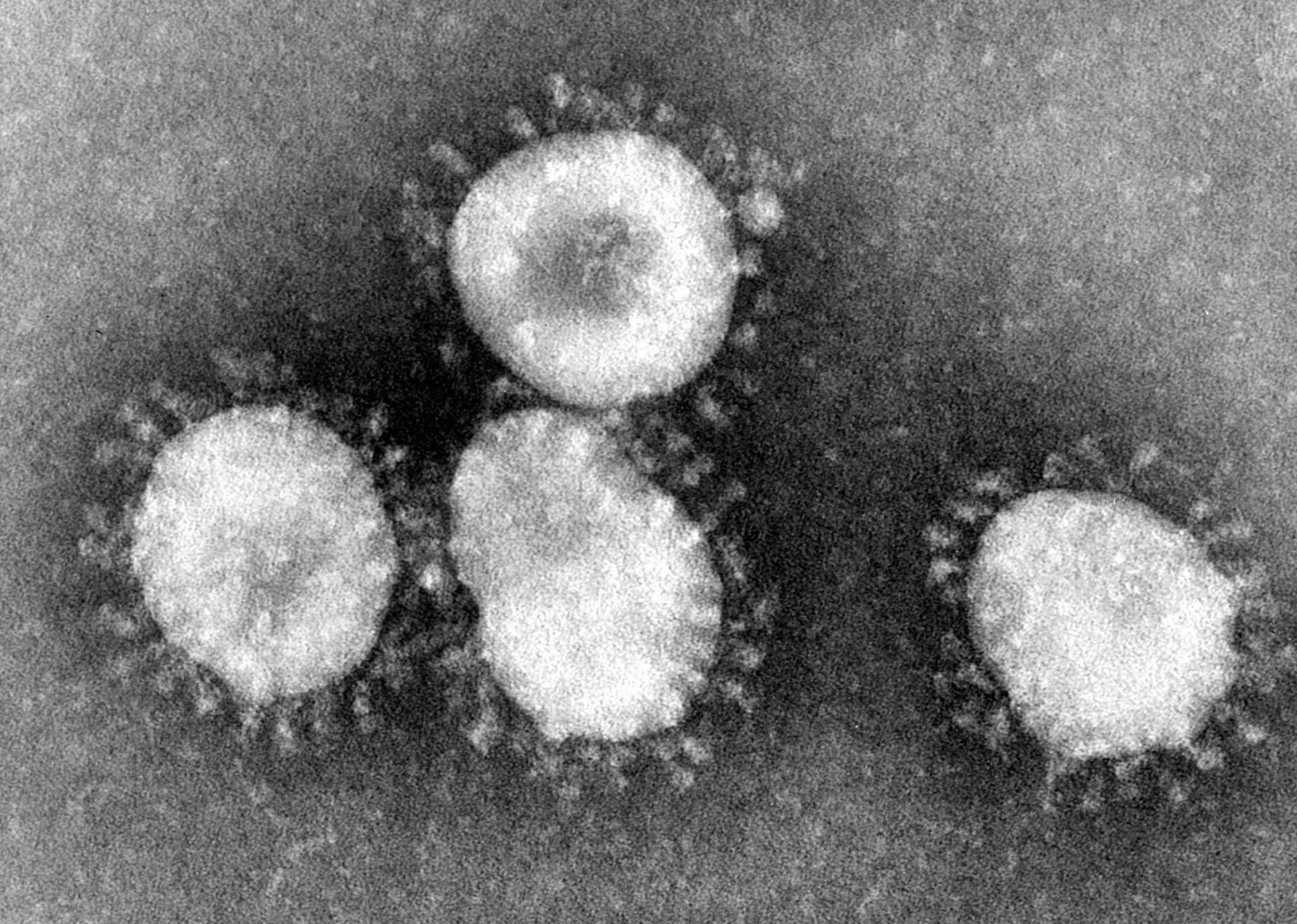
- Transmission electron micrograph of human coronavirus 229E

Virus classification
- (unranked): Virus
- Realm: Riboviria
- Kingdom: Orthornavirae
- Phylum: Pisuviricota
- Class: Pisoniviricetes
- Order: Nidovirales
- Family: Coronaviridae
- Genus: Alphacoronavirus
- Subgenus: Duvinacovirus
- Species: Alphacoronavirus chicagoense

Synonyms
- Human coronavirus 229E; HCoV-229E

= Human coronavirus 229E =

Species of virus

Human coronavirus 229E (HCoV-229E, Alphacoronavirus chicagoense) is a species of coronavirus which infects humans and bats. It is an enveloped, positive-sense, single-stranded RNA virus which enters its host cell by binding to the APN receptor. Along with Human coronavirus OC43 (a member of the Betacoronavirus genus), it is one of the viruses responsible for the common cold. HCoV-229E is a member of the genus Alphacoronavirus and subgenus Duvinacovirus. It is also known as being the first coronavirus in humans, it was isolated at the University of Chicago.

== Transmission ==
HCoV-229E transmits via droplet-respiration and fomites.

== Signs and symptoms ==
HCoV-229E is associated with a range of respiratory symptoms, ranging from the common cold to high-morbidity outcomes such as pneumonia and bronchiolitis. However, such high morbidity outcomes are almost always seen in cases with co-infection with other respiratory pathogens; there is a single published and a single unpublished case to date of a 229E infection that caused acute respiratory distress syndrome (ARDS) in an otherwise healthy patient having no detectable co-infection with another pathogen. HCoV-229E is also among the coronaviruses most frequently codetected with other respiratory viruses, particularly with human respiratory syncytial virus (HRSV).

== Epidemiology ==
HCoV-229E is one of the seven human coronaviruses which include HCoV-NL63, HCoV-OC43, HCoV-HKU1, MERS-CoV, SARS-CoV-1, and SARS-CoV-2 and are globally distributed. However, the viruses were detected in different parts of the world at different times of the year. A NCBI-study found a previous HCoV-229E infection in 42.9% – 50.0% of children of 6–12 months of age and in 65% of those 2.5–3.5 years of age.

== Virology ==
HCoV-229E is one of seven known coronaviruses to infect humans. The other six are:

- Human coronavirus NL63 (HCoV-NL63)
- Human coronavirus OC43 (HCoV-OC43)
- Human coronavirus HKU1 (HCoV-HKU1)
- Middle East respiratory syndrome-related coronavirus (MERS-CoV)
- Severe acute respiratory syndrome coronavirus (SARS-CoV-1)
- Severe acute respiratory syndrome coronavirus 2 (SARS-CoV-2)

== History ==
A researcher at the University of Chicago, Dorothy Hamre, first identified 229E in 1965.

In 2021 the International Committee on Taxonomy of Viruses (ICTV) approved a new system of naming viruses, by using binomial names. In 2024, the species that HCoV-229E is assigned to was renamed Alphacoronavirus chicagoense.

== See also ==
- Virulence
- Outbreak
- RNA virus
- Human coronavirus HKU1
- Positive/negative-sense
