= Pipistrellus bat coronavirus HKU5 =

Virus classification
- (unranked): Virus
- Realm: Riboviria
- Kingdom: Orthornavirae
- Phylum: Pisuviricota
- Class: Pisoniviricetes
- Order: Nidovirales
- Family: Coronaviridae
- Genus: Betacoronavirus
- Subgenus: Merbecovirus
- Species: Betacoronavirus pipistrelli

Species of virus

Pipistrellus bat coronavirus HKU5 (Bat-CoV HKU5) is an enveloped, positive-sense single-stranded RNA (+)ssRNA mammalian Group 4 Betacoronavirus discovered among Japanese pipistrelles in Hong Kong. This strain of coronavirus is closely related to the MERS-CoV responsible for the 2012 Middle East respiratory syndrome-related coronavirus outbreaks in Saudi Arabia, Jordan, United Arab Emirates, the United Kingdom, France, and Italy.

== Transmission ==
The exact means of transmission to humans is not yet well known. However, it has been demonstrated that betaCoV's including HKU5 have the propensity to recombine and cause interspecies transmission. Transmission has not been seen in Group C betaCov's to which MERS-CoV is most closely related. All HKU5 coronaviruses have been shown to use ACE2 from their natural host species, Pipistrellus abramus, to infect their hosts. The lineage 2 of this virus (HKU5-CoV-2) has been isolated from bats in China in 2025 and, similar to some HKU5 lineage 1 viruses, was shown to be capable of using the human ACE2 receptor when exogenous trypsin was included during the infection.

== Predicted SSHHPS ==
SSHHPS are short stretches of homologous host-pathogen sequences found in the protease cleavage sites of the viral polyprotein. SSHHPS appear to be related to the virus-induced phenotype in humans. Analysis of the PLpro SSHHPS in HKU5 identified hits related to neurodevelopmental disorders, epilepsy, seizures, respiratory effects, lung inflammation, spinocerebellar ataxia, microphthalmia, ocular abnormalities, IBS, anhidrosis, hydrocephalus, hearing loss, elevated hemoglobin and hematocrit, skeletal dysplasia, microcephaly, nephrotic syndrome, among others. ADGRA2 was among the predictions.

== Recombination of HKU5-CoV-2 genome ==
Using linkage disequilibrium method, HKU5-CoV-2 genome was detected to have undergone RNA recombination, which caused the change of the receptor binding domain and furin cleavage site of viral spike protein. This alteration may extend the host tropism and range of HUK5-CoV-2 and increase infectivity.

== See also ==
- London1 novel CoV/2012
- Severe acute respiratory syndrome
