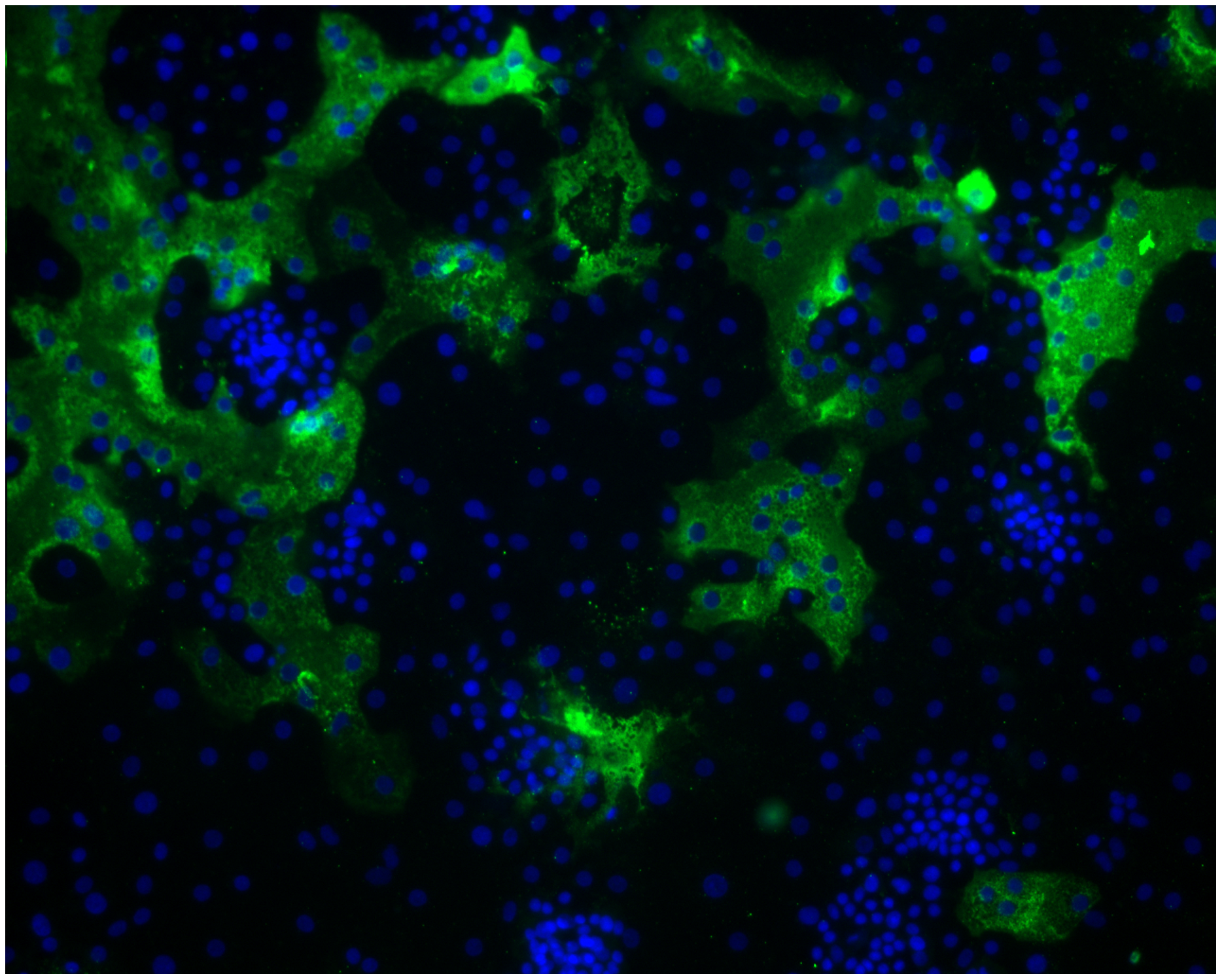
- Formation of HcoV-HKU1

Virus classification
- (unranked): Virus
- Realm: Riboviria
- Kingdom: Orthornavirae
- Phylum: Pisuviricota
- Class: Pisoniviricetes
- Order: Nidovirales
- Family: Coronaviridae
- Genus: Betacoronavirus
- Subgenus: Embecovirus
- Species: Betacoronavirus hongkongense

Synonyms
- Human coronavirus HKU1; HCoV-HKU1

= Human coronavirus HKU1 =

Species of virus

Human coronavirus HKU1 (HCoV-HKU1, Betacoronavirus hongkongense) is a species of coronavirus in humans and animals. It causes an upper respiratory disease with symptoms of the common cold, but can advance to pneumonia and bronchiolitis. It was first discovered in January 2004 from one man in Hong Kong. Subsequent research revealed it has global distribution and earlier genesis.

The virus is an enveloped, positive-sense, single-stranded RNA virus which enters its host cell by binding to the N-acetyl-9-O-acetylneuraminic acid receptor. It has the hemagglutinin esterase (HE) gene, which distinguishes it as a member of the genus Betacoronavirus and subgenus Embecovirus.

== History ==
HCoV-HKU1 was first detected in January 2004, in a 71-year-old man who was hospitalized due to acute respiratory distress syndrome and radiographically confirmed bilateral pneumonia. The man had recently returned to Hong Kong from Shenzhen, China.

In 2024, the species that HCoV-HKU1 belongs to was renamed Betacoronavirus hongkongense.

== Virology ==
Woo and coworkers were unsuccessful in their attempts to grow a HCoV-HKU1 isolate but were able to obtain the complete genomic sequence. Phylogenetic analysis showed that HKU1 is most closely related to the mouse hepatitis virus (MHV), and is distinct in that regard from other known human betacoronaviruses, such as HCoV-OC43. The virus has been successfully cultured by Pyrc and coworkers in the ex vivo model of human respiratory epithelium. Additional research has revealed that the virus attaches itself to O-acetylated sialic acids on the cell surface, which instigates a conformational shift in the S protein, facilitating interaction with the entry receptor. Intriguingly, the enzyme kallikrein 13 has been identified as an activating factor responsible for the spike protein processing by the Pyrc's team. This could potentially specify the virus's tissue and cellular preference, and might also govern the regulation of interspecies transmission.

When the RNA-dependent RNA polymerase (RdRp), spike (S), and nucleocapsid (N) genes were analyzed, incompatible phylogenetic relationships were discovered. Complete genome sequencing of 22 strains of HCoV-HKU1 confirmed this was due to natural recombination. HCoV-HKU1 likely originated from rodents.

HCoV-HKU1 is one of seven known coronaviruses to infect humans. The other six are:

- Human coronavirus 229E (HCoV-229E)
- Human coronavirus NL63 (HCoV-NL63)
- Human coronavirus OC43 (HCoV-OC43)
- Middle East respiratory syndrome-related coronavirus (MERS-CoV)
- Severe acute respiratory syndrome coronavirus (SARS-CoV-1)
- Severe acute respiratory syndrome coronavirus 2 (SARS-CoV-2)

The structures of HCoV-HKU1 spike (S) and hemagglutinin esterase (HE) proteins have been resolved by Cryo-EM in 2016 and 2020, respectively. The S protein (PDB: 5I08) has been noted for its large size. The HE protein (PDB: 6Y3Y) differs from conventional ones (such as the one in OC43) by having a much smaller vestigial lectin domain. This domain is shielded from recognition by the immune system via size changes and glycosylation.

== Epidemiology ==
A trace-back analysis of SARS negative nasopharyngeal aspirates from patients with respiratory illness during the SARS period in 2003, identified the presence of CoV-HKU1 RNA in the sample from a 35-year-old woman with pneumonia.

Following the initial reports of the discovery of HCoV-HKU1, the virus was identified that same year in 10 patients in Northern Australia. Respiratory samples were collected between May and August (winter in Australia). Investigators found that most of the HCoV-HKU1–positive samples originated from children in the later winter months.

The first known cases in the Western hemisphere were discovered in 2005 after analysing older specimens by clinical virologists at Yale-New Haven Hospital in New Haven, Connecticut who were curious to discover if HCoV-HKU1 was in their area. They conducted a study of specimens collected in a 7-week period (December 2001 – February 2002) in 851 infants and children. Specimens of nine children had human coronavirus HKU1. These children had respiratory tract infections at the time the specimens were collected (in one girl so severe that mechanical ventilation was needed), while testing negative for other causes like human respiratory syncytial virus (RSV), parainfluenza viruses (types 1–3), influenza A and B viruses, and adenovirus by direct immunofluorescence assay as well as human metapneumovirus and HCoV-NH by reverse transcription polymerase chain reaction (RT-PCR). The researchers reported that the strains identified in New Haven were similar to the strain found in Hong Kong and suggested a worldwide distribution. These strains found in New Haven is not to be confused with HCoV-NH (New Haven coronavirus), which is a strain of Human coronavirus NL63.

In July 2005, six cases were reported in France. In these cases, French investigators utilized improved techniques for recovering the virus from nasopharyngeal aspirates and from stool samples.

== See also ==
- Tylonycteris bat coronavirus HKU4
- Rousettus bat coronavirus HKU9
