= Hibecovirus =

Virus classification
- (unranked): Virus
- Realm: Riboviria
- Kingdom: Orthornavirae
- Phylum: Pisuviricota
- Class: Pisoniviricetes
- Order: Nidovirales
- Family: Coronaviridae
- Genus: Betacoronavirus
- Subgenus: Hibecovirus
- Species: Betacoronavirus hipposideri

Subgenus of viruses

Hibecovirus is a subgenus of viruses in the genus Betacoronavirus, consisting of a single species, Bat Hp-betacoronavirus Zhejiang2013 (Betacoronavirus hipposideri).

Strains forming the viral species Bat Hp-betacoronavirus Zhejiang2013 were discovered in Hipposideros pratti bats from China in 2013.
