= Rousettus bat coronavirus HKU9 =

Virus classification
- (unranked): Virus
- Realm: Riboviria
- Kingdom: Orthornavirae
- Phylum: Pisuviricota
- Class: Pisoniviricetes
- Order: Nidovirales
- Family: Coronaviridae
- Genus: Betacoronavirus
- Subgenus: Nobecovirus
- Species: Betacoronavirus rousetti

Bat virus

Rousettus bat coronavirus HKU9 is bat Betacoronavirus.

== See also ==
- RNA virus
- Animal viruses
