= Heptad repeat =

The heptad repeat is an example of a structural motif that consists of a repeating pattern of seven amino acids:

 a b c d e f g
 H P P H C P C

where H represents hydrophobic residues, C represents, typically, charged residues, and P represents polar (and, therefore, hydrophilic) residues. The positions of the heptad repeat are commonly denoted by the lowercase letters a through g.

These motifs are the basis for most coiled coils and, in particular, leucine zippers, which have predominantly leucine in the d position of the heptad repeat.

A conformational change in a heptad repeat in the SARS-CoV-2 spike protein facilitates entry of the virus into the host cell membrane.
