= TRIM14 =

Protein found in humans

Identifiers
- Aliases: TRIM14, tripartite motif containing 14
- External IDs: OMIM: 606556; MGI: 1921985; GeneCards: TRIM14

Gene location (Human)
Chr.	Chromosome 9 (human)
Band	9q22.33	Start	98,069,275 bp
Band	9q22.33	End	98,119,222 bp

Gene location (Mouse)
Chr.	Chromosome 4 (mouse)
Band	4|4 B1	Start	46,493,781 bp
Band	4|4 B1	End	46,536,141 bp
RNA expression pattern
Bgee	Human / Mouse (ortholog); Top expressed in: palpebral conjunctiva; jejunal mucosa; pancreatic ductal cell; amniotic fluid; duodenum; epithelium of nasopharynx; granulocyte; mucosa of colon; gingival epithelium; mucosa of ileum / Top expressed in: spermatocyte; granulocyte; female urethra; male urethra; embryo; yolk sac; thymus; esophagus; lobe of prostate; spermatid; More reference expression data
BioGPS	n/a
Gene ontology
Molecular function	zinc ion binding; metal ion binding; molecular function
Cellular component	cytoplasm; intracellular anatomical structure; mitochondrion; mitochondrial outer membrane; membrane
Biological process	positive regulation of DNA-binding transcription factor activity; positive regulation of NF-kappaB transcription factor activity; immune system process; negative regulation of viral transcription; innate immune response
Sources:Amigo / QuickGO
Orthologs
Databases	NCBI: entry; OMA: entry
Species	Human	Mouse
Entrez	9830	74735
Ensembl	ENSG00000106785	ENSMUSG00000039853
UniProt	Q14142	Q8BVW3
RefSeq (mRNA)	NM_014788; NM_033219; NM_033220; NM_033221	NM_029077
RefSeq (protein)	NP_055603; NP_150088	NP_083353
Location (UCSC)	Chr 9: 98.07 – 98.12 Mb	Chr 4: 46.49 – 46.54 Mb
PubMed search
- Wikidata
View/Edit Human	View/Edit Mouse

Tripartite motif-containing 14 is a protein encoded by the TRIM14 gene in the human genome. It belongs to the TRIM family of proteins which contain the TRIM motif on the N-terminus. TRIM14 lacks the RING domain within the motif and therefore it loses the function of E3 ubiquitin ligase in eukaryotic cells. Instead, the PRYSPRY domain on the C-terminus allows TRIM14 to be categorized into an evolutionarily younger group of TRIM proteins which are involved in the regulation of innate immunity. TRIM 14 is localized in both the cytoplasm and the cell nucleus.

== Function ==
TRIM14 acts in cell proliferation, differentiation, morphogenesis, autophagy and in the initiation of the anti-viral immune response by innate immunity.

Overexpression of TRIM14 in mouse embryonic stem cells (mESC) leads to upregulation of several genes (hsp90ab1, prr13, pu.1, tnfrsf13c (baff-r), tnfrsf13b (taci), hlx1, hbp1, junb and pdgfrb) which are involved in early stage differentiation of embryonic stem cells, in the mesodermal layer. The same genes are upregulated in human embryonic kidney cells 293 (HEK293) (except for hlx1, hbp1, junb and pdgfrb). Therefore, TRIM14 regulates gene expression in different cell types by a universal mechanism: interaction with the transcription factors common to TRIM proteins. The mouse homologue of TRIM14, the "Pub protein", was shown to interact with transcription factor PU.1 (SPI1) and inhibit its activity. PU.1 is a transcription factor critical for proliferation and differentiation of myeloid cells and B lymphocytes. Hence, TRIM14 (Pub) is likely associated with the regulation of development of the immune cells.

TRIM14 transfected HEK293 cell show increased transcription of eighteen genes involved in the innate immune system. They are ifna, il6 (ifnb2), isg15, raf-1, NF-kB (nf-kb1, rela, nf-kb2, relb), grb2, grb3-3, traf3ip2, junB, c-myb, pu.1, akt1, tyk2, erk2, and mek2. In the same cells, the stable expression of TRIM14 allowed the suppression of the replication of Sindbis virus. The influence of TRIM14 on RNA viruses replication was proven in several experiments and it was found to be upregulated in viral-infected tissues. Additionally, TRIM14 knockout mice are lethal after herpes simplex virus (HSV) infection.

The antiviral role of TRIM14 has also been confirmed by the inhibition of the selective autophagic degradation of the cytoplasmic DNA sensor, cGAS. In normal cells, cGAS is modified by the K48-polyubiquitin chain. It goes to the p62 mediated autophagic degradation and the type I IFN signalling is suppressed. Induction of TRIM14 by type I IFN leads to activation of USP14 which then cleaves the polyubiquitin chain from cGAS and type I IFN signalling is stabilized. So, there is a positive loop between TRIM14 and type I IFN signalling.

== Expression pattern ==
The mRNA for TRIM14 has been found in many organs with a prevalence in those organs with a high number of immune cells such as the spleen, lymph nodes, and gastrointestinal tract.
