= ADGRA2 =

Protein-coding gene in the species Homo sapiens

Identifiers
- Aliases: ADGRA2, G protein-coupled receptor 124, TEM5, GPR124, adhesion G protein-coupled receptor A2
- External IDs: OMIM: 606823; MGI: 1925810; GeneCards: ADGRA2

Gene location (Human)
Chr.	Chromosome 8 (human)
Band	8p11.23	Start	37,784,191 bp
Band	8p11.23	End	37,844,896 bp

Gene location (Mouse)
Chr.	Chromosome 8 (mouse)
Band	8|8 A2	Start	27,575,611 bp
Band	8|8 A2	End	27,613,464 bp
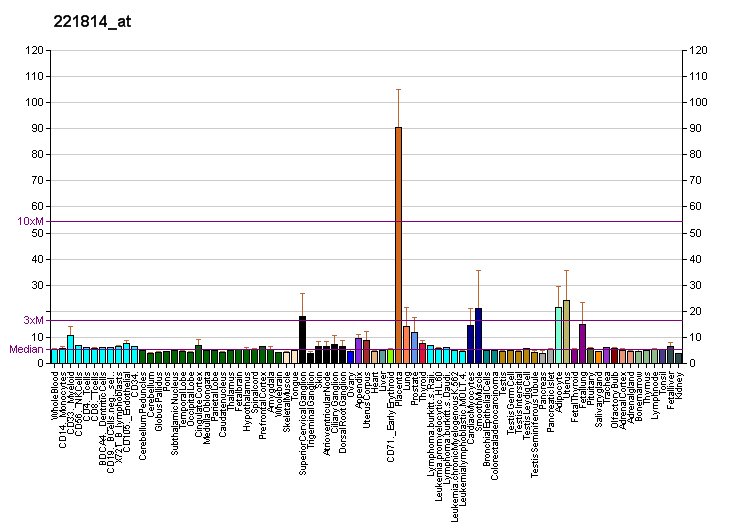

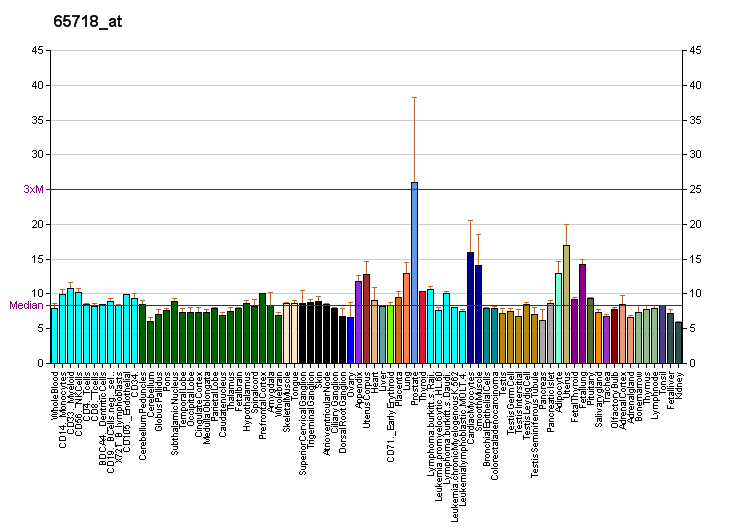
RNA expression pattern
Bgee	Human / Mouse (ortholog); Top expressed in: stromal cell of endometrium; seminal vesicula; canal of the cervix; left uterine tube; saphenous vein; body of uterus; gallbladder; right ovary; tail of epididymis; superficial temporal artery / Top expressed in: umbilical cord; dermis; external carotid artery; Gonadal ridge; yolk sac; endocardial cushion; internal carotid artery; vas deferens; uterus; abdominal wall; More reference expression data
BioGPS	More reference expression data
Gene ontology
Molecular function	G protein-coupled receptor activity; protein binding; signal transducer activity; transmembrane signaling receptor activity
Cellular component	integral component of membrane; cell surface; plasma membrane; membrane; cell projection; filopodium
Biological process	positive regulation of endothelial cell migration; G protein-coupled receptor signaling pathway; cell surface receptor signaling pathway; central nervous system development; negative regulation of vascular endothelial growth factor signaling pathway; sprouting angiogenesis; regulation of angiogenesis; endothelial cell migration; regulation of chemotaxis; angiogenesis; signal transduction; regulation of establishment of blood-brain barrier
Sources:Amigo / QuickGO
Orthologs
Databases	NCBI: entry; OMA: entry
Species	Human	Mouse
Entrez	25960	78560
Ensembl	ENSG00000020181	ENSMUSG00000031486
UniProt	Q96PE1	Q91ZV8
RefSeq (mRNA)	NM_032777	NM_054044
RefSeq (protein)	NP_116166	NP_473385
Location (UCSC)	Chr 8: 37.78 – 37.84 Mb	Chr 8: 27.58 – 27.61 Mb
PubMed search
- Wikidata
View/Edit Human	View/Edit Mouse

Adhesion G protein-coupled receptor A2 is a protein that in humans is encoded by the ADGREA2 gene (previously GPR124). It is a member of the adhesion-GPCR family of receptors. Family members are characterized by an extended extracellular region with a variable number of protein domains coupled to a TM7 domain via a domain known as the GPCR-Autoproteolysis INducing (GAIN) domain.

== Interactions ==
ADGRA2 has been shown to interact with DLG1 and is involved in the Wnt/β-catenin signaling pathway along with RECK. ADGRA2 is the predicted target of several Group IV (+)ssRNA neuroinvasive viruses; proteolytic cleavage of ADGRA2 by these viral proteases may be important for entry into the brain. ADGRA2 was predicted using SSHHPS.

Zebrafish embryos with Gpr124 loss of function demonstrate severe angiogenic deficiencies in the central nervous system.
