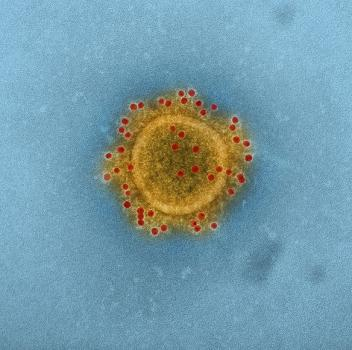
- Middle East respiratory syndrome-related coronavirus particle envelope proteins immunolabeled with rabbit HCoV-EMC/2012 primary antibody and goat anti-rabbit 10 nm gold particles.

Virus classification
- (unranked): Virus
- Realm: Riboviria
- Kingdom: Orthornavirae
- Phylum: Pisuviricota
- Class: Pisoniviricetes
- Order: Nidovirales
- Family: Coronaviridae
- Genus: Betacoronavirus
- Subgenus: Merbecovirus
- Species: Middle East respiratory syndrome-related coronavirus
- Strain: MERS coronavirus EMC/2012

Synonyms
- HCoV-EMC/2012; Human coronavirus Erasmus Medical Center/2012; MERS coronavirus Erasmus Medical Center/2012; Middle East respiratory syndrome-related coronavirus EMC/2012; Middle East respiratory syndrome-related coronavirus Erasmus Medical Center/2012

= MERS coronavirus EMC/2012 =

Strain of Middle East respiratory syndrome-related coronavirus

MERS coronavirus EMC/2012 (MERS coronavirus Erasmus Medical Center/2012) is a strain of coronavirus isolated from the sputum of the first person to become infected with what was later named Middle East respiratory syndrome–related coronavirus (MERS-CoV), a virus that causes Middle East respiratory syndrome (MERS).

== Natural reservoir ==
An investigation of bat roosts in Bisha, the hometown of the index patient, by the Saudi Ministry of Health discovered an Egyptian tomb bat in a large roost close to the index patient's home. Phylogenetic analysis showed a 100% match between the virus isolated from the bat and MERS coronavirus EMC/2012 isolated from the index patient.

== Virology ==
MERS coronavirus EMC/2012 is the sixth coronavirus known to infect humans and the first human virus within betacoronavirus lineage C. It is a new genotype which is related to bat coronaviruses, specifically an Egyptian tomb bat, and is not the same beta-CoV as the SARS-CoV, but is distantly related.

== See also ==
- Novel virus
