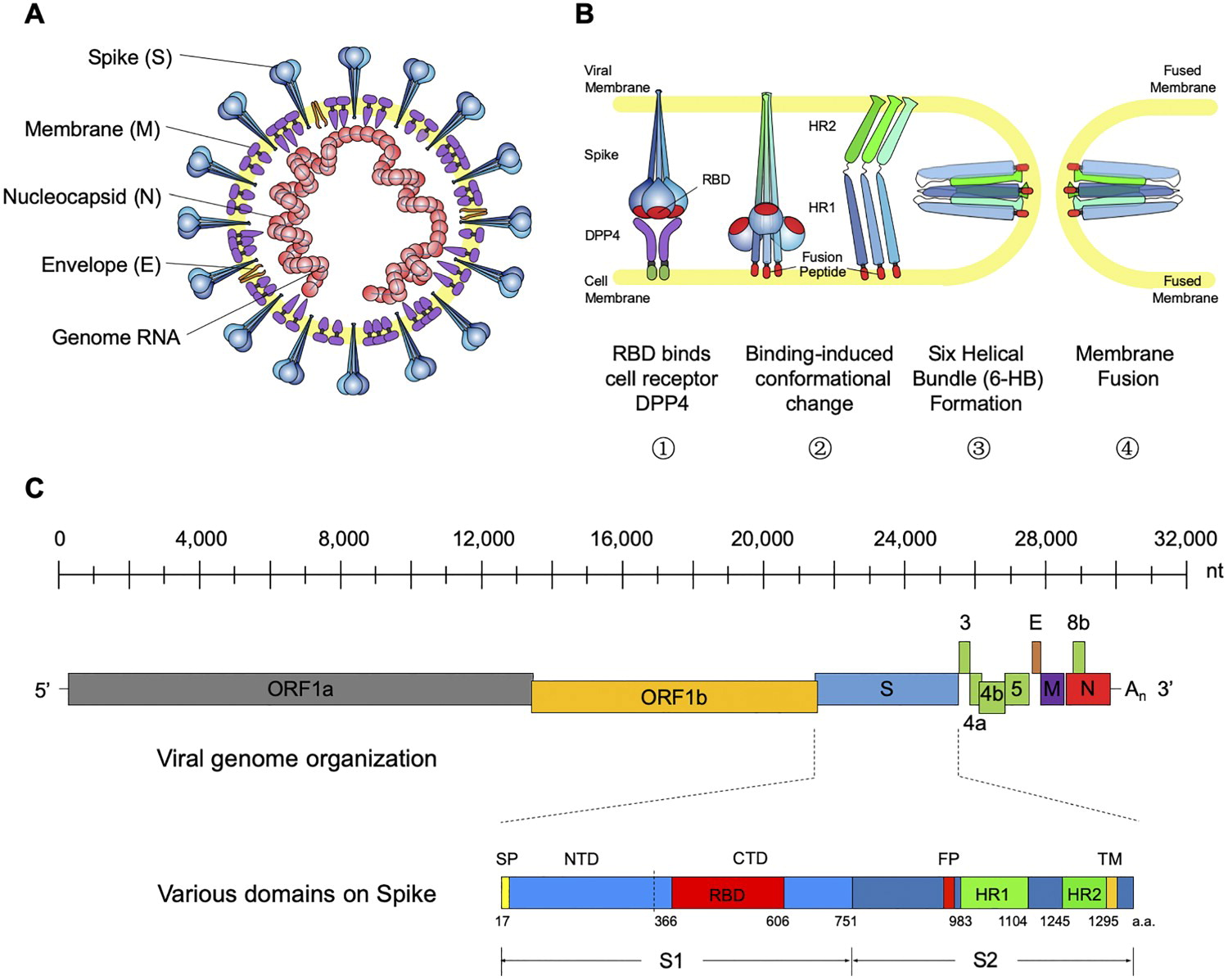
- MERS-CoV: structure, attachment, viral entry, and genomic composition

Virus classification
- (unranked): Virus
- Realm: Riboviria
- Kingdom: Orthornavirae
- Phylum: Pisuviricota
- Class: Pisoniviricetes
- Order: Nidovirales
- Family: Coronaviridae
- Genus: Betacoronavirus
- Subgenus: Merbecovirus

= Merbecovirus =

Subgenus of viruses

Merbecovirus is a subgenus of viruses in the genus Betacoronavirus, including the human pathogen Middle East respiratory syndrome–related coronavirus (MERS-CoV). The viruses in this subgenus were previously known as group 2c coronaviruses.

== Taxonomy ==
The subgenus contains the following species, listed by scientific name and followed by the exemplar virus of the species:

- Betacoronavirus cameli, Middle East respiratory syndrome-related coronavirus (MERS-CoV)
- Betacoronavirus erinacei, Hedgehog coronavirus 1
- Betacoronavirus pipistrelli, Pipistrellus bat coronavirus HKU5
- Betacoronavirus tylonycteridis, Tylonycteris bat coronavirus HKU4

== Structure ==
The viruses of this subgenus, like other coronaviruses, have a lipid bilayer envelope in which the membrane (M), envelope (E) and spike (S) structural proteins are anchored.

== See also ==
- Embecovirus (group 2a)
- Sarbecovirus (group 2b)
- Nobecovirus (group 2d)
