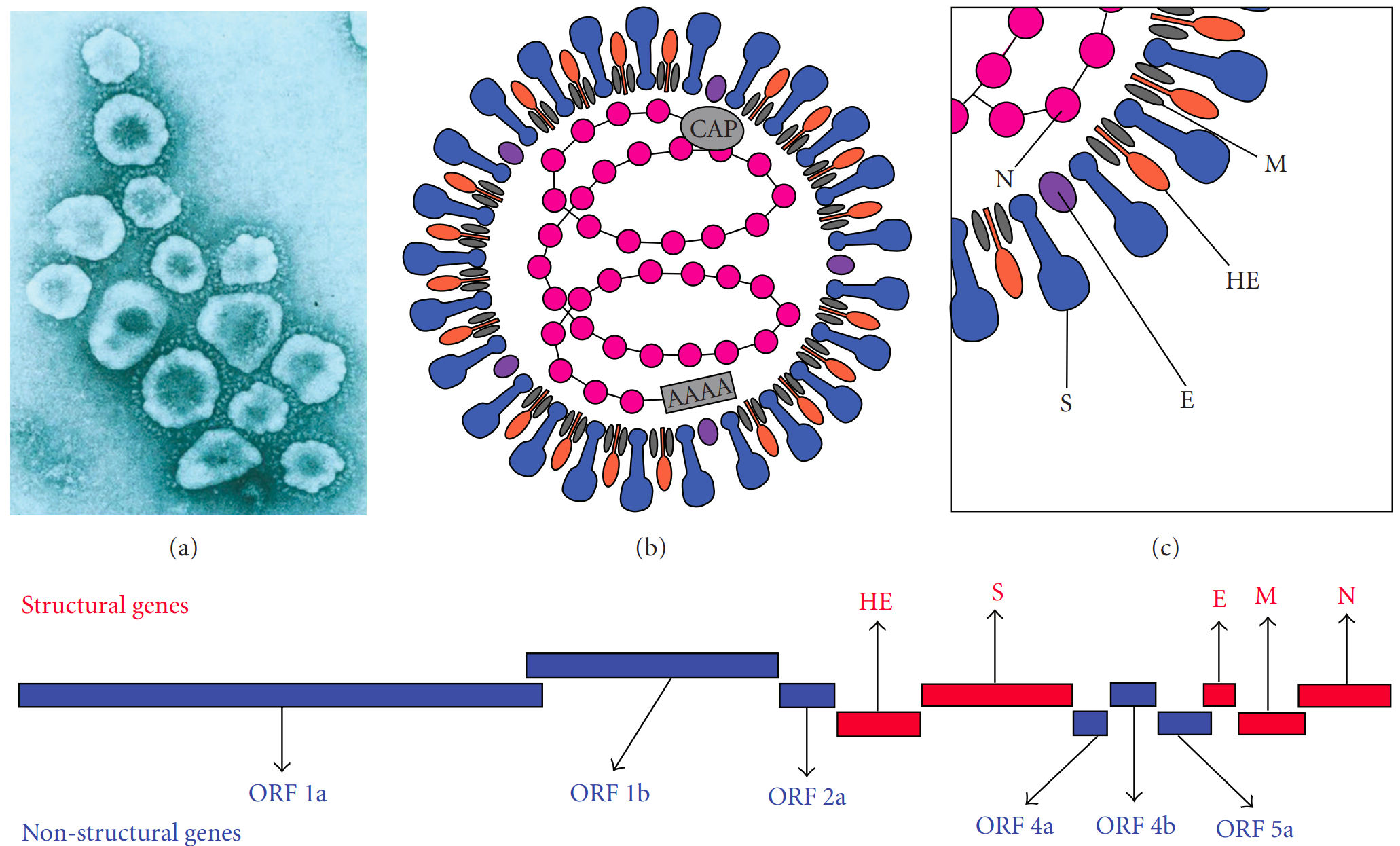
- Murine coronavirus (MHV) virion electron micrograph, schematic structure, and genome

Virus classification
- (unranked): Virus
- Realm: Riboviria
- Kingdom: Orthornavirae
- Phylum: Pisuviricota
- Class: Pisoniviricetes
- Order: Nidovirales
- Family: Coronaviridae
- Subfamily: Orthocoronavirinae
- Genus: Betacoronavirus

Subgenera and species
- See text

= Betacoronavirus =

Genus of viruses

Betacoronavirus (β-CoVs or Beta-CoVs) is one of four genera (Alpha-, Beta-, Gamma-, and Delta-) of coronaviruses. Member viruses are enveloped, positive-strand RNA viruses that infect mammals, including humans. The natural reservoir for betacoronaviruses are bats and rodents. Rodents are the reservoir for the subgenus Embecovirus, while bats are the reservoir for the other subgenera.

The coronavirus genera are each composed of varying viral lineages with the betacoronavirus genus containing four such lineages: A, B, C, D. In older literature, this genus is also known as "group 2 coronaviruses". The genus is in the subfamily Orthocoronavirinae in the family Coronaviridae, of the order Nidovirales.

The betacoronaviruses of the greatest clinical importance concerning humans are OC43 and HKU1 (which can cause the common cold) of lineage A, SARS-CoV-1 and SARS-CoV-2 (the causes of SARS and COVID-19 respectively) of lineage B, and MERS-CoV (the cause of MERS) of lineage C. MERS-CoV is the first betacoronavirus belonging to lineage C that is known to infect humans.

== Etymology ==
The name "betacoronavirus" is derived from Ancient Greek βῆτα (bē̂ta, "the second letter of the Greek alphabet"), and κορώνη (korṓnē, “garland, wreath”), meaning crown, which describes the appearance of the surface projections seen under electron microscopy that resemble a solar corona. This morphology is created by the viral spike (S) peplomers, which are proteins that populate the surface of the virus and determine host tropism. The order Nidovirales is named for the Latin nidus, which means 'nest'. It refers to this order's production of a 3′-coterminal nested set of subgenomic mRNAs during infection.

== Structure ==
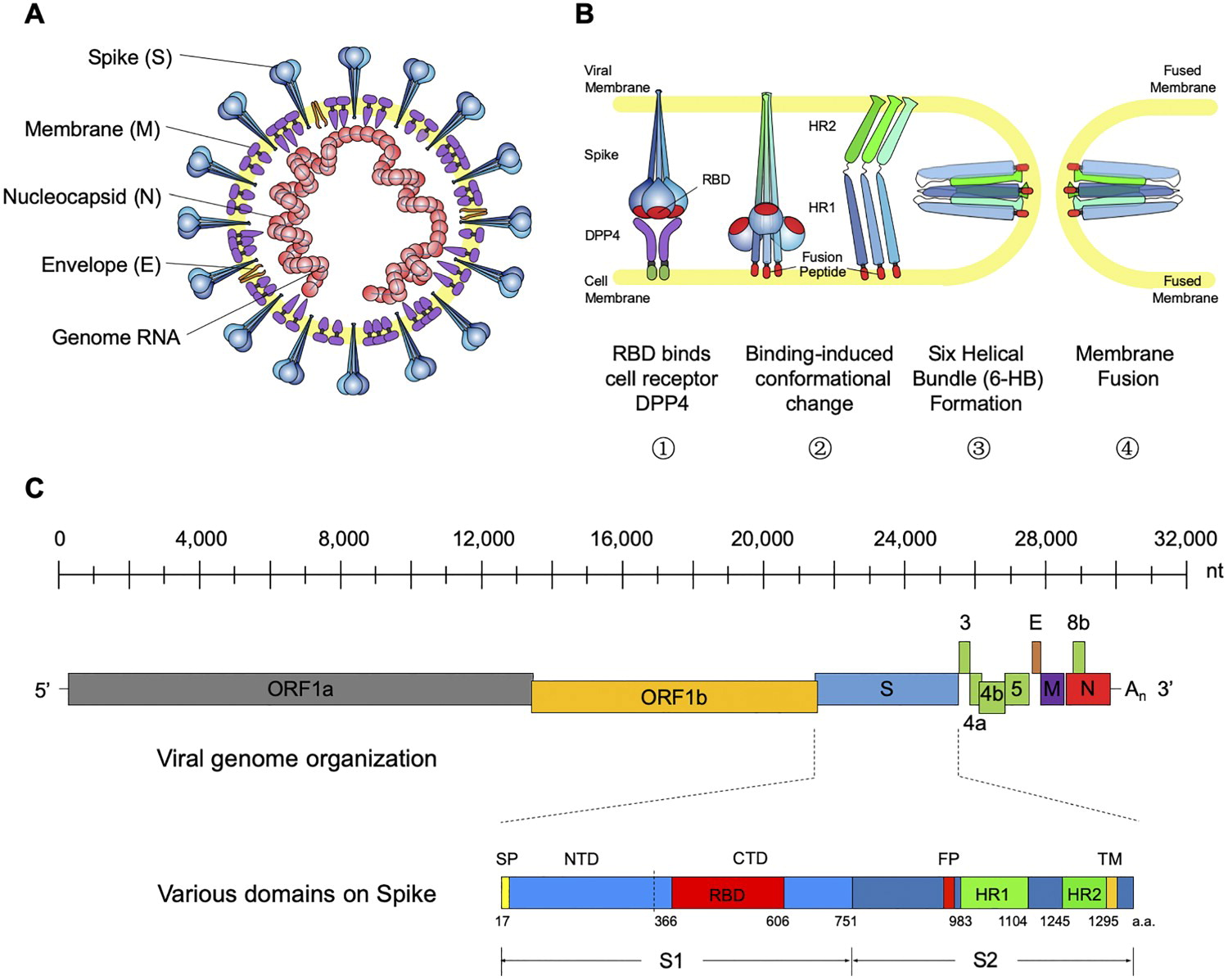
MERS-CoV: structure, attachment, entrance, and genomic composition

Several structures of the spike proteins have been resolved. The receptor binding domain in the alpha- and betacoronavirus spike protein is cataloged as InterPro: IPR018548. The spike protein, a type 1 fusion machine, assembles into a trimer (PDB: 3jcl, 6acg); its core structure resembles that of paramyxovirus F (fusion) proteins. The receptor usage is not very conserved; for example, among Sarbecovirus, only a sub-lineage containing SARS share the ACE2 receptor.

The viruses of subgenera Embecovirus differ from all others in the genus in that they have an additional shorter (8 nm) spike-like protein called hemagglutinin esterase (HE) (P15776). It is believed to have been acquired from influenza C virus.

== Genome ==
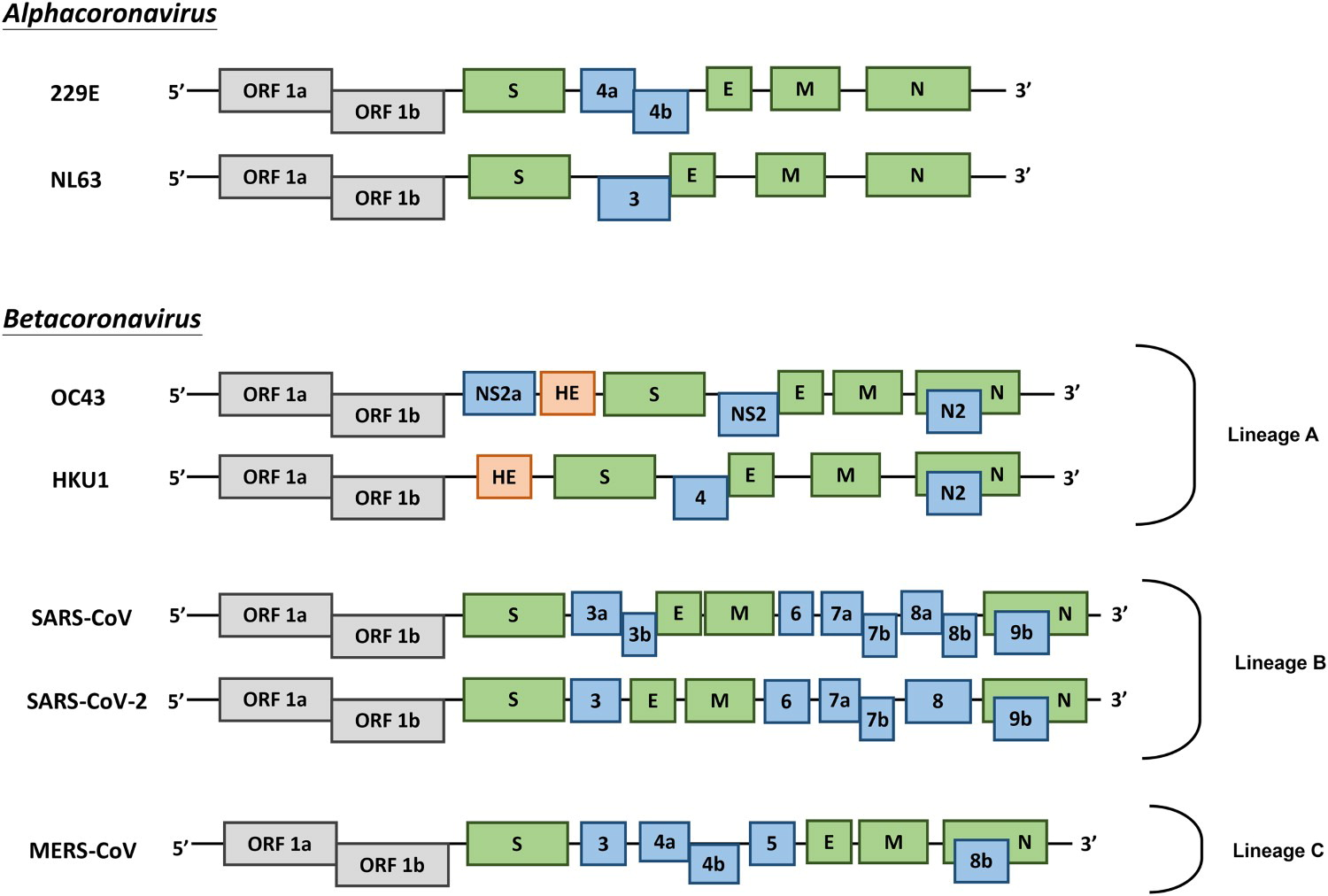
Genomes of alphacoronaviruses and betacoronaviruses

Coronaviruses have a large genome size that ranges from 26 to 32 kilobases. The overall structure of β-CoV genome is similar to that of other CoVs, with an ORF1ab replicase polyprotein (rep, pp1ab) preceding other elements. This polyprotein is cleaved into 16 nonstructural proteins (see UniProt annotation of SARS rep, P0C6X7).

As of May 2013, GenBank has 46 published complete genomes of the α- (group 1), β- (group 2), γ- (group 3), and δ- (group 4) CoVs.

== Recombination ==
Genetic recombination can occur when two or more viral genomes are present in the same host cell. The dromedary camel Beta-CoV HKU23 exhibits genetic diversity in the African camel population. Contributing to this diversity are several recombination events that had taken place in the past between closely related betacoronaviruses of the subgenus Embecovirus. Also the betacoronavirus, Human SARS-CoV, appears to have had a complex history of recombination between ancestral coronaviruses that were hosted in several different animal groups.

== Pathogenesis ==
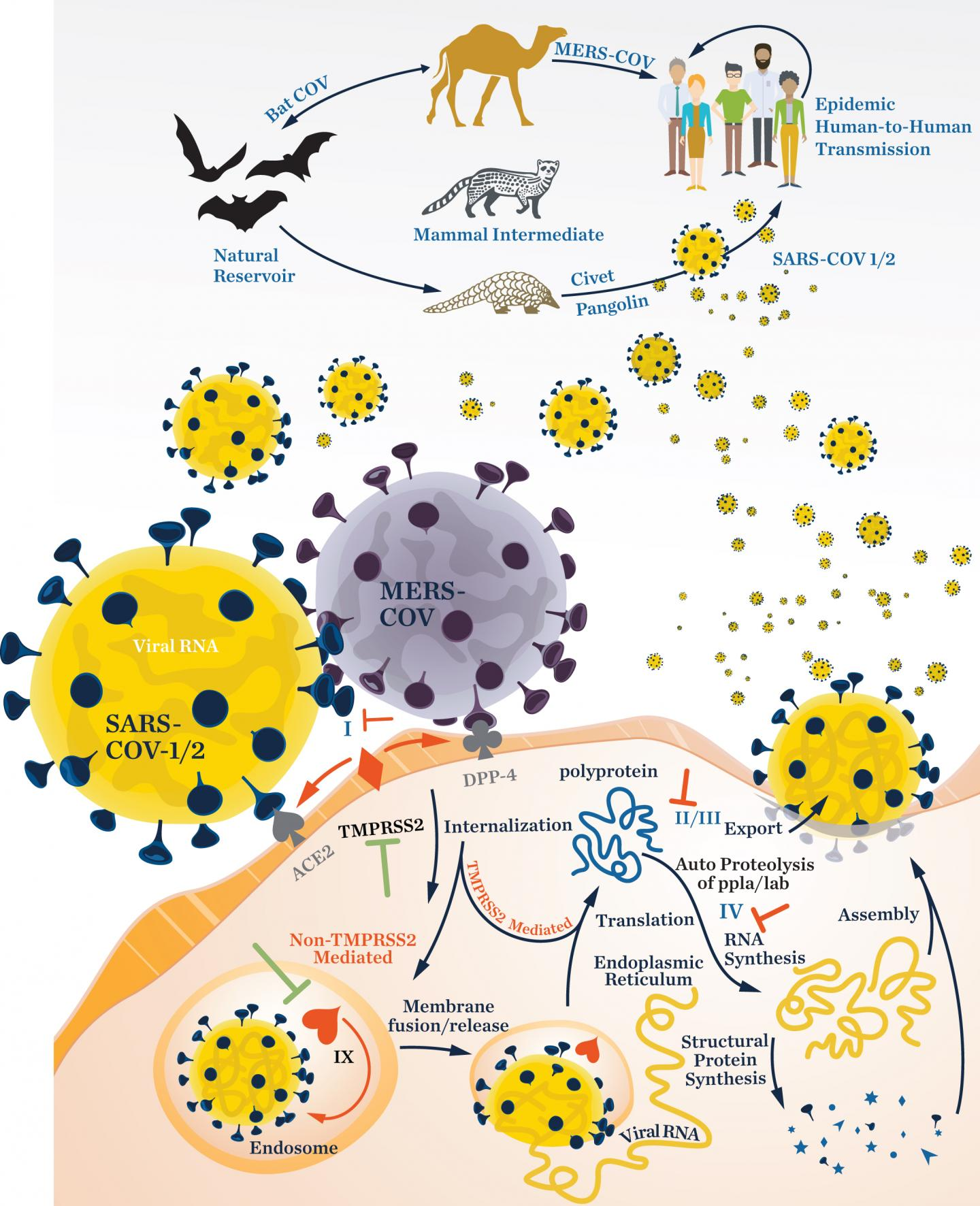
Replication cycle of viruses of genus Betacoronavirus

Alpha- and betacoronaviruses mainly infect bats, but they also infect other species like humans, camels, and rodents. Betacoronaviruses that have caused epidemics in humans generally induce fever and respiratory symptoms. They include:

- SARS-CoV, causing SARS.
- MERS-CoV, causing MERS.
- SARS-CoV-2, causing COVID-19.

== Classification ==
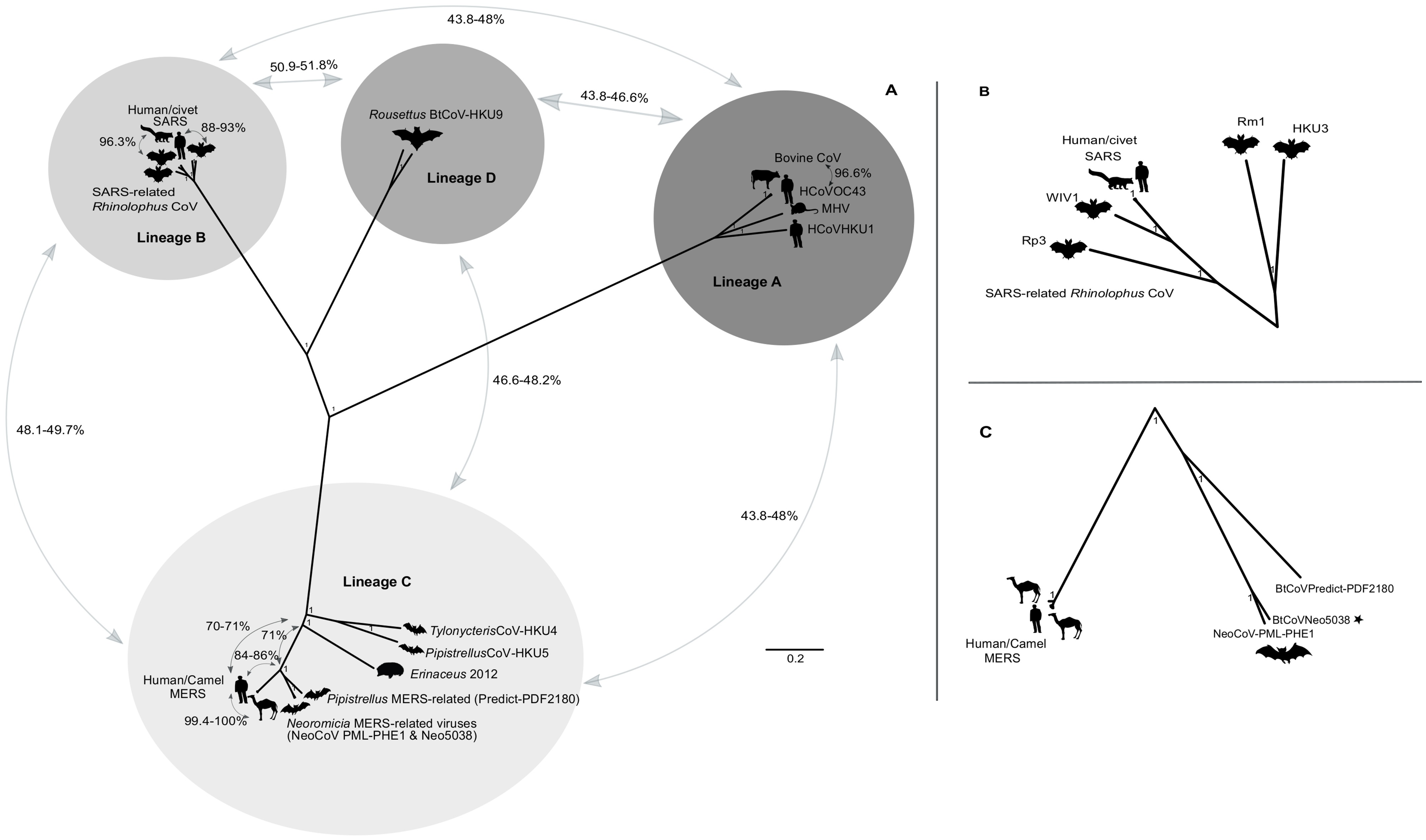
Phylogenetic tree of the lineages of genus Betacoronavirus with detail for SARS-CoV and MERS-CoV

Within the genus Betacoronavirus (Group 2 CoV), four subgenera or lineages (A, B, C, and D) have traditionally been recognized. The four lineages have also been named using Greek letters or numerically. A fifth subgenus, Hibecovirus, was added more recently. Member subgenera and species include:

- Subgenus Embecovirus (lineage A)
  - Betacoronavirus gravedinis, Human coronavirus OC43, Bovine coronavirus
  - Betacoronavirus hongkongense, Human coronavirus HKU1
  - Betacoronavirus muris, Murine hepatitis virus
  - Betacoronavirus myodae, Myodes rufocanus vole coronavirus 2/JL2014
  - Betacoronavirus ratti, Betacoronavirus HKU24
- Subgenus Hibecovirus
  - Betacoronavirus hipposideri, Bat Hp-betacoronavirus/Zhejiang2013
- Subgenus Merbecovirus (lineage C)
  - Betacoronavirus cameli, Middle East respiratory syndrome-related coronavirus (MERS-CoV)
  - Betacoronavirus erinacei, Hedgehog coronavirus 1
  - Betacoronavirus pipistrelli, Pipistrellus bat coronavirus HKU5
  - Betacoronavirus tylonycteridis, Tylonycteris bat coronavirus HKU4
- Subgenus Nobecovirus (lineage D)
  - Betacoronavirus cororeum, Rousettus bat coronavirus GCCDC1
  - Betacoronavirus eidoli, Eidolon helvum bat coronavirus CMR704-P12
  - Betacoronavirus rousetti, Rousettus bat coronavirus HKU9
- Subgenus Sarbecovirus (lineage B)
  - Betacoronavirus pandemicum (SARS-related coronavirus)
      - Severe acute respiratory syndrome coronavirus (SARS-CoV or SARS-CoV-1)
      - Severe acute respiratory syndrome coronavirus 2 (SARS-CoV-2)

== See also ==
- Animal viruses
