= World Health Assembly =

Governing body of the WHO

- Abbreviation: WHA
- Formation: 1948
- Type: Forum through which the World Health Organization (WHO) is governed.
- Legal status: Active
- Headquarters: Geneva, Switzerland
- Members: 194 Countries
- Chairperson: Dr. Hanan Mohamed Al Kuwari (Kuwait)
- Parent organization: World Health Organization
- Website: who.int/about/governance/world-health-assembly

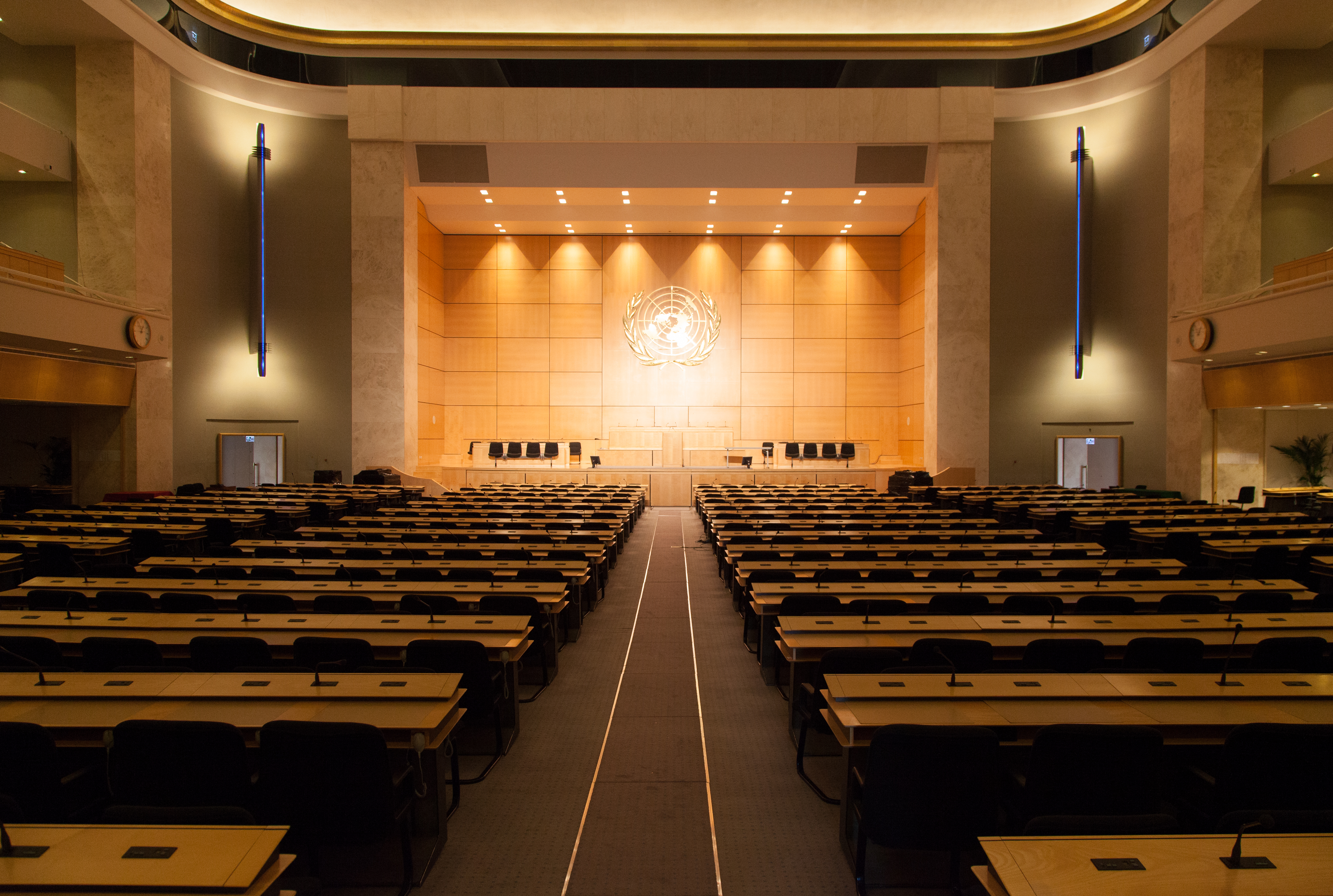
The World Health Assembly meets in the assembly hall of the Palace of Nations, in Geneva (Switzerland).

The World Health Assembly (WHA) is the forum through which the World Health Organization (WHO) is governed by its 193 member states. It is the world's highest health policy setting body and is composed of health ministers from member states.

The members of the WHA generally meet every year in May in Geneva, Switzerland, at the Palace of Nations, the location of WHO Headquarters. The main tasks of the WHA are to decide major policy questions, as well as to approve the WHO work programme and budget and elect its Director-General (every fifth year) and annually to elect ten members to renew part of its executive board. Its main functions are to determine the policies of the Organization, supervise financial policies, and review and approve the proposed programme budget.

== Members, observers and rules ==
The original membership of the WHA, at the first assembly held in 1948, numbered 55 member states. The WHA has, currently, 193 member states (all UN members without Liechtenstein and the United States, plus the Cook Islands and Niue).

The WHA also includes two associate members, Puerto Rico and Tokelau. In addition, seven agencies have observer status at the WHA – the Vatican, the Palestinian Authority, the Sovereign Military Order of Malta, the International Committee of the Red Cross, the International Federation of Red Cross and Red Crescent Societies, the South Centre organization, and the Inter-Parliamentary Union.

The Assembly is governed by Rules of Procedure of the World Health Assembly; agenda items are set by the General Committee of the Assembly, a group of 25 individuals that includes the President and subcommittee chairs, and a number of delegates elected by the Assembly previous.

=== Taiwan ===
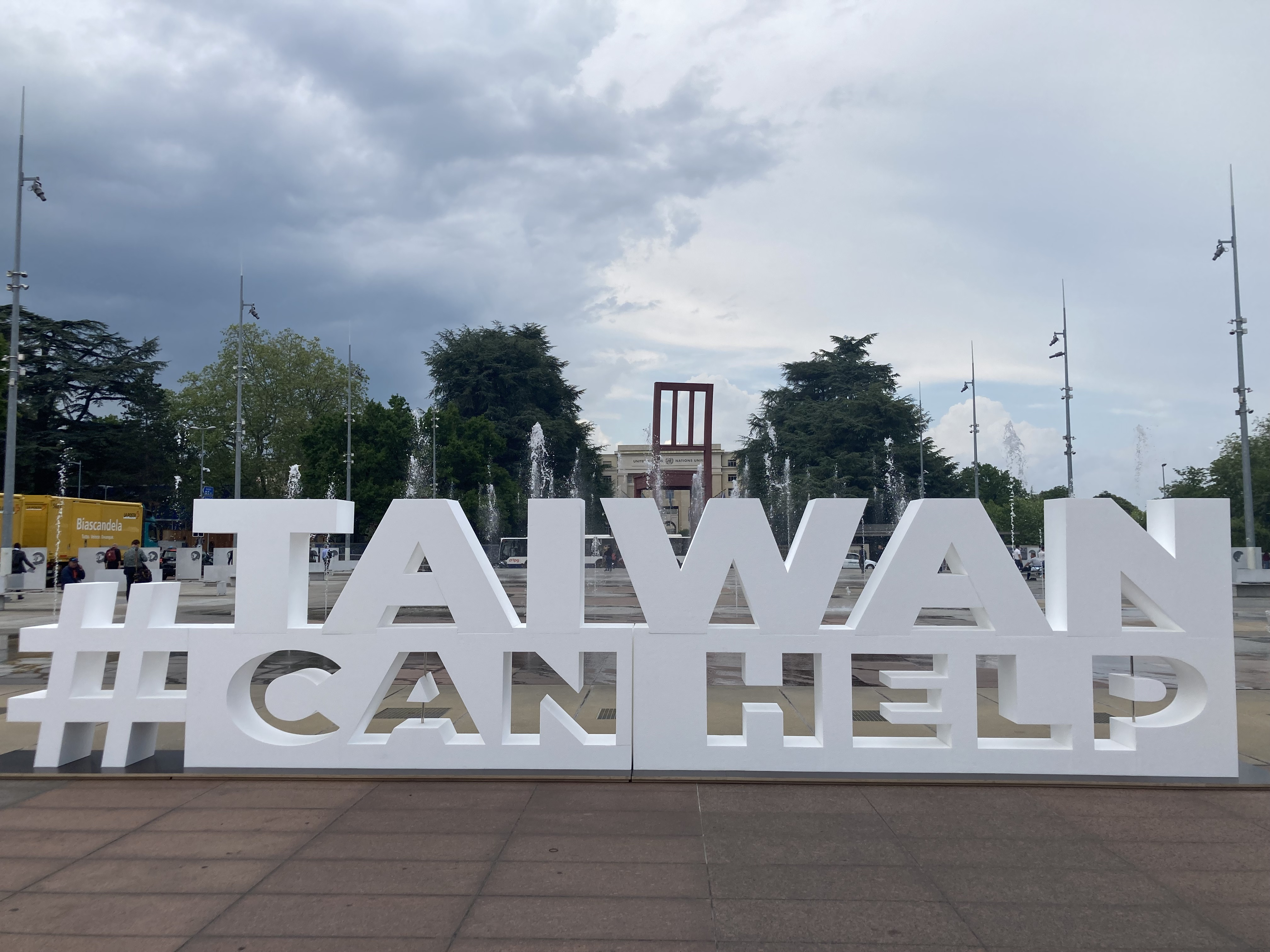
"#TaiwanCanHelp" installation art displayed in front of the Palace of Nations in Geneva during the 2023 World Health Assembly

Taiwan participated as an observer to the WHA for 8 years between 2008 and 2016, under the name "Chinese Taipei". The WHA allows non-state entities to join as observers, whereas the WHO requires statehood to be its member. However, since the 71st WHA in 2017, pressure from the Chinese government has prevented Taiwan from participating in the WHA again. The United States, Australia, Germany, and Japan are among countries that support the re-inclusion of Taiwan.

== Executive board ==
Each year, the WHA elects members from among its ranks to renew the executive board (EB). This body is governed in Chapter VI, Articles 24 through 29, of the Constitution of the WHO. The EB must have an equitable geographic distribution, and "shall be elected for three years and may be re-elected... The Board shall meet at least twice a year and shall determine the place of each meeting." This is invariably chosen (by consensus) to be Geneva. A current list of members on the executive board can be derived through consultation of the WHA #Annual Assemblies summaries which are posted below.

== Resolutions ==
The main international policy frameworks adopted through WHA resolutions include:

- International Health Regulations
- International Code of Marketing of Breast-milk Substitutes, adopted in 1981
- Framework Convention on Tobacco Control, adopted in 2003
- Global Code of Practice on the International Recruitment of Health Personnel, adopted in 2010

In addition, the WHA has endorsed through resolutions a number of WHO action plans dealing with different areas to improve health around the world, such as:

- Worldwide eradication of smallpox, first endorsed in 1959, and then declared to have been won in 1980
- Worldwide eradication of polio, first endorsed in 1988, recently re-affirmed in 2011
- Control of human hookworm infection through regular deworming of at-risk school children, endorsed in 2001
- WHO global action plan for workers' health, endorsed in 2007
- Control of harmful use of alcohol, endorsed in 2010
- Enhanced global actions for the prevention and control of non-communicable diseases, endorsed in 2011

The WHA is also responsible for the endorsement of the WHO Family of International Classifications, a series of internationally standardized medical classifications, including the International Classification of Diseases (ICD) and the International Classification of Functioning, Disability and Health (ICF).

== Annual Assemblies ==
=== 2008: Sixty-first WHA ===
The focus of the 61st WHA was public health. Participants from 190 countries attended, with a record 2704 delegates. Important briefings and resolutions involved intellectual property barriers in research and development; combatting non-communicable diseases and female genital mutilation; campaigns to support breastfeeding and to decrease abuse of alcohol and tobacco; immunization practices, including adoption of the term "pharma fraud"; and health issues facing migrants.

=== 2009: Sixty-second WHA ===
In her role as global patron of The White Ribbon Alliance for Safe Motherhood, and chair of the Maternal Mortality Campaign, Sarah Brown gave the keynote speech at the World Health Organization's 62nd WHA, alongside United Nations Secretary-General Ban Ki-moon, asking "Where is the M in MCH?' [maternal and child health]" in an echo of Allan Rosenfield's landmark Lancet article of 1985 – and highlighting that the numbers of women dying in pregnancy and childbirth were still the same 14 years later.

=== 2012: Sixty-fifth WHA ===
Among other actions, the 65th Assembly endorsed the Rio Political Declaration to address the social determinants of health, intended to spearhead support for all countries to adopt inclusive Health For All approaches to health promotion. It also endorsed the first World Immunization Week.

=== 2013: Sixty-sixth WHA ===
In her address to the 66th WHA in May 2013, DGWHO Margaret Chan traced a brief history of revisions to the International Health Regulations following the SARS outbreak in 2002–3, the "first severe new disease of the 21st century." She observed that the two new diseases WHO is dealing with in 2013 are the novel coronavirus (MERS), from the same family as SARS, detected in 2012 in Saudi Arabia, and the first-ever human infections with the H7N9 avian influenza virus reported in China in 2013. She attributed the positive report by the World Health Statistics (May 2013) on dramatic improvement in health in the world's poorest countries from 1993 to 2013, to the emphasis placed on poverty alleviation by the Millennium Development Goals. She announced the emergence of global action plans for noncommunicable diseases, mental health, and the prevention of avoidable blindness and visual impairment calling for a life course approach which includes "equity through universal health coverage," preventive strategies and "integrated service delivery."

Chan declared at the assembly that intellectual property, or patents on strains of new virus, should not impede nations from protecting their citizens by limiting scientific investigations. Following the 2012 MERS outbreak, Saudi Arabia Deputy Minister of Health Ziad Memish raised concerns that scientists who applied for a patent would not allow the MERS-Coronavirus to be used for investigations by other scientists and were, therefore, delaying the development of diagnostic tests. Ten of the 22 people who died and 22 of 44 cases reported were in Saudi Arabia. Saudi Arabia–based microbiologist Ali Mohamed Zaki reported the first known case, a 60-year-old Saudi man who got sick in June 2012 on ProMed-mail, a public health on-line forum then published more details including the virus's genetic makeup and closest relatives. The Erasmus Medical Center "tested, sequenced and identified" a sample provided by Ali Mohamed Zaki. Erasmus MC and Dr. Zaki strongly refuted all allegations concerning a presumed lack of willingness to cooperate in research into the new MERS coronavirus, making diagnostic tests and virus specimens freely available to all research institutions around the globe.

=== 2014: Sixty-seventh WHA ===
The 67th WHA took place in Geneva from 19 to 24 May 2014. Among the more than 20 resolutions adopted by the Assembly included ones concerning strengthening of national drug management systems to address antimicrobial resistance; implementation of the Minamata Convention to protect human health and the environment from effects of exposure to mercury and mercury compounds; and improving access to essential medicines worldwide. Also endorsed was a global monitoring framework for maternal, infant and child nutrition.

Following the 67th WHA, DGWHO Chan was criticized by the Association of Correspondents Accredited to the United Nations (ACANU) for not having spoken directly to the media during the course of the Assembly.

=== 2015: Sixty-eighth WHA ===
The 68th session of the WHA took place in Geneva from 18 to 26 May 2015. Jagat Prakash Nadda assumed the presidency of WHA. India assumed the presidency after a gap of 19 years.

During the assembly the WHA agreed to the Global Malaria Strategy and Programme Budget for 2016–2017, polio, International Health Regulations, strengthening surgical care, WHO's reform of its emergency and response programme, antimicrobial resistance, immunization gaps, malnutrition, air pollution, and epilepsy. Annual health awards were given by the DGWHO and the President of WHA.

=== 2016: Sixty-ninth WHA ===
The 69th World Health Assembly took place from 23 to 28 May 2016, and agreed to pursue the health-related Sustainable Development Goals (SDGs) through a comprehensive set of foundational steps, prioritizing universal health coverage, working with actors outside the health sector to address the social, economic and environmental root causes of antimicrobial resistance and other human health problems, to continue expanding efforts to address poor maternal and child health and infectious diseases in developing countries, and to focus upon equity within and between countries. Delegates decided to invite the WHO Framework Convention on Tobacco Control's (WHO FCTC) Conference of the Parties (COP) to provide information on outcomes of this biennial event to future World Health Assembly meetings.

=== 2017: Seventieth WHA ===
The 70th World Health Assembly took place from 22 to 31 May 2017. For the first time since 2009, Taiwan was completely excluded from the WHA, following the election of Tsai Ing-wen and subsequent political pressure from China.

=== 2018: Seventy-first WHA ===
The 71st World Health Assembly took place from 21 to 26 May 2018.

Australia, Chile, China, Djibouti, Finland, Gabon, Germany, Indonesia, Israel, Romania, Sudan, and United States of America were elected to the executive board.

=== 2019: Seventy-second WHA ===
The 72nd World Health Assembly took place from 20 to 28 May 2019. Argentina, Austria, Bangladesh, Burkina Faso, Grenada, Guyana, Kenya, Singapore, Tajikistan, Tonga, Tunisia, United Arab Emirates were elected to the executive board. The President of WHA72 was Dr Bounkong Syhavong of the Lao People's Democratic Republic.

=== 2020: Seventy-third WHA ===
The 73rd World Health Assembly took place virtually from 18 to 19 May 2020, due to the COVID-19 pandemic.

Keva Bain of The Bahamas was selected President of WHA73. Botswana, Colombia, Ghana, Guinea-Bissau, India, Madagascar, Oman, Republic of Korea, Russian Federation, United Kingdom of Great Britain and Northern Ireland were elected to the executive board. Harsh Vardhan of India became the chairman of the executive board.

Multiple countries, led by the United States, called for the reinstatement of Taiwan's observer status in protest against Chinese pressure.

On 25 May, delegates reached a consensus to hold a special session in November 2021 to consider the International Treaty on Pandemic Prevention, Preparedness and Response.

=== 2021: Seventy-fourth WHA ===
The 74th World Health Assembly took place virtually from 24 May to 1 June 2021, due to the COVID-19 pandemic. The 2021 event focused on the theme: "Ending this pandemic, preventing the next: building together a healthier, safer and fairer world".

=== 2021: WHA Special Session ===
The WHA gathered for a special session (only the second in the history of the WHO) on 29 November 2021, to draft and negotiate an International Treaty on Pandemic Prevention, Preparedness and Response.

=== 2022: Seventy-fifth WHA ===
The 75th World Health Assembly took place from 22 to 28 May 2022. The theme of the 2022 Health Assembly was: "Health for peace, peace for health."

=== 2023: Seventy-sixth WHA ===
The 76th World Health Assembly took place from 21 to 30 May 2023. The theme of the 2023 Health Assembly was: "WHO at 75: Saving lives, driving health for all."

=== 2024: Seventy-seventh WHA ===
The 77th World Health Assembly took place from 27 May to 1 June 2024. The theme of the 2024 Health Assembly was: "All for Health, Health for All."

=== 2025: Seventy-eighth WHA ===
The 78th World Health Assembly took place from 19 to 27 May 2025. The theme of the 2025 Health Assembly was: "One World for Health." At a side event during the assembly, several countries signed an African Union-led agreement to eliminate visceral leishmaniasis and backed closer regional cooperation to advance elimination goals.

=== 2026: Seventy-ninth WHA ===
The 79th World Health Assembly took place from 18 to 23 May 2026.

== See also ==
- United Nations General Assembly resolutions
- United Nations Security Council resolutions
