= Coronavirus outbreak (disambiguation) =

The COVID-19 pandemic is the current ongoing global outbreak of coronavirus disease 2019 (COVID-19) caused by SARS-CoV-2.

Coronavirus outbreak may also refer to:

- 2002–2004 SARS outbreak, caused by Severe acute respiratory syndrome coronavirus (SARS-CoV or SARS-CoV-1)
- 2012 Middle East respiratory syndrome coronavirus outbreak, caused by Middle East respiratory syndrome coronavirus (MERS-CoV)
- 2015 Middle East respiratory syndrome outbreak in South Korea, caused by MERS-CoV
- 2018 Middle East respiratory syndrome outbreak, caused by MERS-CoV
