= National Influenza Centers =

National Influenza Centers (also called National Influenza Centres) are institutions which are formally recognized as such by the World Health Organization (WHO).

"The WHO Global Influenza Surveillance Network was established in 1952. The network comprises 4 WHO Collaborating Centres (WHO CCs) and 112 institutions in 83 countries, which are recognized by WHO as WHO National Influenza Centres (NICs). These NICs collect specimens in their country, perform primary virus isolation and preliminary antigenic characterization. They ship newly isolated strains to WHO CCs for high level antigenic and genetic analysis, the result of which forms the basis for WHO recommendations on the composition of influenza vaccine for the Northern and Southern Hemisphere each year."

Among the more than 110 National Influenza Centers are the WHO Collaborating Centres and reference laboratories that are involved in annual influenza vaccine composition recommendations.

== See also ==
- Disease surveillance
- WHO collaborating centres in occupational health
