= Coronavirus in Saudi Arabia =

Coronavirus in Saudi Arabia may refer to:

- 2012 Middle East respiratory syndrome coronavirus outbreak, coronavirus outbreak which originated from Saudi Arabia in 2012
- 2018 Middle East respiratory syndrome outbreak, coronavirus outbreak which originated from Saudi Arabia in 2012
- COVID-19 pandemic in Saudi Arabia, which began in 2020
