= World Health Organization collaborating centre =

World Health Organization collaborating centres are institutions that work with the World Health Organization (WHO) in disciplines such as occupational health, food safety, and communicable disease prevention. There are over 700 such centres across 80 countries. Collaborating centres may be research institutes, parts of universities, or academies. The participating institutions partner with WHO to perform research, provide training, or offer other services in furthering the WHO health agenda. These partners are designated by the WHO director-general as a part of a collaborative network. By using networks of established organizations, WHO is able to strengthen the scientific validity of its work and lower the costs of research.

== Centres worldwide ==
The World Health Organization has established networks related to a variety of health topics. For example, WHO has put in place centres focused on organ transplants, hearing loss prevention, hepatitis, leprosy, medical ethics, and maternal health. To move the work forward, WHO has numerous designated centres in each inhabited continent. The network of centres for reference and research on influenza draws upon resources from Japan, the United States, the United Kingdom, and Australia. The network of WHO collaborating centres in occupational health is chaired by Dr. John Howard, director of the U.S. National Institute for Occupational Safety and Health, and contains more than 60 designated organizations from across the globe. The WHO Collaborating Centre on Global Governance of Antimicrobial Resistance has been working on the Coronavirus disease 2019 and is directed by Steven Hoffman.

Following the eradication of worldwide smallpox, the WHO encouraged the destruction of any stocks of the virus in laboratories, or to transfer them to one of two reference laboratories, the WHO Collaborating Centers for Smallpox and Other Poxvirus Infections; one in Atlanta, and the other in Moscow. The Russian samples were moved to the Vector Institute in 1994.
