= Coronavirus in South Korea =

Coronavirus in South Korea may refer to:

- 2015 Middle East respiratory syndrome outbreak in South Korea, coronavirus outbreak which affected South Korea in 2015
- COVID-19 pandemic in South Korea, coronavirus outbreak which affected South Korea from 2020
