= Ali Mohamed Zaki =

Egyptian physician and virologist

Ali Mohamed Zaki is an Egyptian physician and virologist known for first discovering the Middle East Respiratory Syndrome virus while working at the Dr. Soliman Fakeeh Hospital, Jeddah, Saudi Arabia. He isolated the virus from the lungs of a patient admitted to the hospital with severe viral pneumonia of unknown aetiology. Soon after Zaki posted an alert on proMED, the Saudi Arabian Ministry of Health pressured the hospital to sever his contract, and he returned to Egypt under fear of reprisal. The sequence was then characterised and named by Ron Fouchier and his team Erasmus MC as MERS.

== Publications ==
- Isolation of a novel coronavirus from a man with pneumonia in Saudi Arabia
