= WHO collaborating centres in occupational health =

The WHO collaborating centres in occupational health constitute a network of institutions put in place by the World Health Organization to extend availability of occupational health coverage in both developed and undeveloped countries. The effort includes 64 collaborating centres that have been designated as such by the WHO director-general. The centres in the network meet triennially to develop work plans for advancing occupational health in key areas. The 2009-2012 work plan includes 220 projects, which relate to 5 objectives and 14 priorities as outlined by a global plan of action for workers' health.

== Leadership structure ==
As director of the U.S. National Institute for Occupational Safety and Health, John Howard is the chairman of the WHO Global Network of Collaborating Centres in Occupational Health. Within the network, activity area managers plan day-to-day activities within projects adopted by the network. Deputy managers monitor activities and evaluate progress of the involved centres.

== 2009-2012 Work Plan ==
The global plan of action sets forth five major objectives:

- to devise and implement policy instruments on workers' health
- to protect and promote health at the workplace
- to improve the performance of and access to occupational health services
- to provide and communicate evidence for action and practice
- to incorporate workers' health into non-health policies and projects

Using these key goals, the activity area managers have set priorities for specific areas of occupational health.

== Participating centres ==
Centres in the network are designated by the WHO director-general. Seven organizations constitute the network's advisory committee:

- National Institute for Occupational Safety and Health (NIOSH), USA
- National Institute for Working Life (NIWL), Sweden
- Finnish Institute for Occupational Health (FIOH), Finland
- Institute for Pesticide Safety and Health Risk Prevention, Italy
- National University of Singapore
- FUNDACENTRO, Brazil
- National Institute for Occupational Health (NIOH), South Africa

Other participants working with the centres include the International Labour Organization (ILO), the International Commission on Occupational Health (ICOH), the International Occupational Hygiene Association (IOHA), and the International Ergonomics Association (IEA).

== Key projects and activities ==
The collaborating centres have participated in a number of conferences, provided research on occupational safety and health topics, and engaged in varied campaigns and activities such as an inititiative promoting global road safety for workers.
