= Bounkong Syhavong =

Laotian politician

Bounkong Syhavong is a Laotian politician and the current Minister for Health.
