= WHO global plan of action for workers' health =

The World Health Organization's global plan of action for workers' health delineates common principles by which workplaces should abide by, including the ability for workers to enjoy the highest attainable standard of physical and mental health and favorable working conditions, as well as the prioritization of the prevention of occupational health hazards. The plan was endorsed by the Sixtieth World Health Assembly on May 23, 2007 because of several concerns. First, workers represent a significant contribution to the world's economic and social development. Furthermore, an international disparity between countries of occupational hazard prevention and access to occupational health services was observed. As such, the plan is grounded on both humanitarian and economically practical grounds.

== Workers' health: global plan of action ==
The plan of action deals with all aspects of workers' health, including primary prevention of occupational hazards, protection and promotion of health at work, employment conditions, and a better response from health systems to workers' health. It is underpinned by certain common principles. All workers should be able to enjoy the highest attainable standard of physical and mental health and favorable working conditions. The workplace should not be detrimental to health and well-being. Primary prevention of occupational health hazards should be given priority. All components of health systems should be involved in an integrated response to the specific health needs of working populations.

== Objectives ==
The plan lists several actions for the "member states" that adopt it.

=== Devise and implement policy instruments on workers' health ===
Countries and member states should formulate their national policy frameworks to promote workers' health, strengthening their ministries of health, and integrating workers' health concerns into national health strategies. They also need to minimize the gaps between different groups of workers in terms of levels of risk and health status. High-risk economic sectors and vulnerable working populations, such as younger and older workers, need special consideration and protection.

=== Protect and promote health at the workplace ===
Member states should improve their health risk management. They must adopt basic occupational health standards and make certain that all workplaces comply with minimum requirements. They must work to promote health and prevent noncommunicable diseases in the workplace, in particular by advocating healthy diet and physical activity among workers, and promoting mental and family health at work. Additionally, the plan suggests that global health threats, such as tuberculosis, HIV/AIDS, malaria, and avian influenza, can also be prevented and controlled at the workplace.

=== Improve the performance of and access to occupational health services ===
Member states can improve their coverage and quality of occupational health services by integrating their development into national health strategies, health-sector reforms and plans for improving health systems performance; determining standards for organization and coverage of occupational health services; setting targets for increasing the coverage of the working population with occupational health services; creating mechanisms for pooling resources and for financing the delivery of occupational health services; ensuring sufficient and competent human resources; and establishing quality assurance systems.

=== Provide and communicate evidence for action and practice ===
Member states must design systems for surveillance of workers' health. This includes establishing national information systems, building capability to estimate the occupational burden of diseases and injuries, creating registries of exposure to major risks, occupational accidents and occupational diseases, and improving reporting and early detection of such accidents and diseases. Also strategies and tools need to be elaborated for improving communication and raising awareness about workers' health. They should target workers, employers and their organizations, policy-makers, the general public, and the media.

=== Incorporate workers' health into other policies ===
Measures to protect workers' health should be incorporated in economic development policies and poverty reduction strategies. Employment policies should be designed to influence worker health.

== Implementation ==
The plan suggests that improving the health of workers can be achieved through well-coordinated efforts of society as a whole, under government leadership and with substantial participation of workers and employers. WHO and its partners express in the plan an intention to work with the member states to promote partnership and joint action with ILO and other organizations of the United Nations system, organizations of employers, trade unions, and other stakeholders in civil society and the private sector in order to strengthen international efforts on workers' health. Also to implement the plan the WHO expects to provide guidelines, promote and monitor their use, and contribute to the adoption and implementation of international labor conventions. The plan of action will be reviewed and monitored using a set of national and international indicators of achievement.
