= Ron Fouchier =

Virologist from the Netherlands (born 1966)

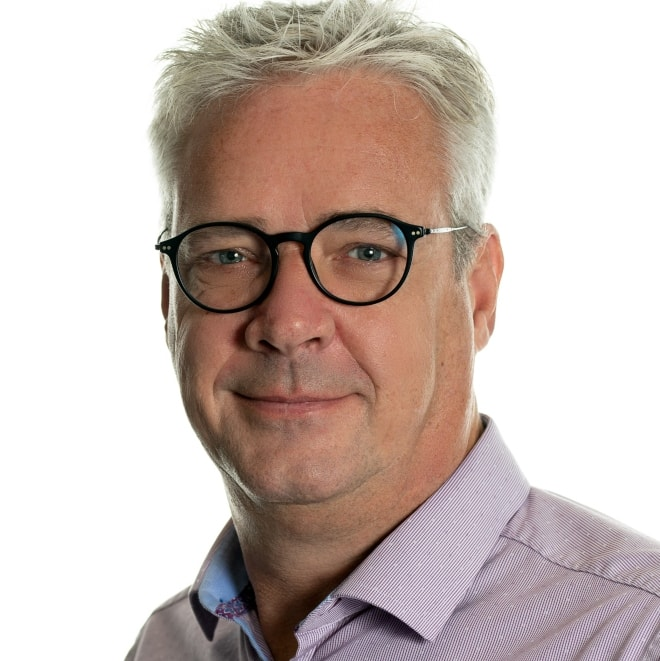
- Born: Ronaldus Adrianus Maria Fouchier; October 13, 1966 (age 59)
- Occupation: Virologist

Ronaldus (Ron) Adrianus Maria Fouchier (born 13 October 1966) is a Dutch virologist who is Deputy head of the Erasmus MC Department of Viroscience, headed by Marion Koopmans.

== Career ==
Fouchier conducts research on respiratory viruses of humans and animals, antigenic drift, and influenza virus zoonoses, transmission and pandemics. His team contributed substantially to the identification and characterization of various novel viruses, such as human metapneumovirus, human coronavirus NL63, SARS coronavirus, MERS coronavirus, and influenza A virus subtype H16.

== Honours and awards ==
In 2006 he received the Heine-Medin award of the European Society for Clinical Virology and in 2013 the Huibregtsen award for top innovative science with societal impact. Fouchier was elected member of the Royal Netherlands Academy of Arts and Sciences (KNAW) in 2016. He is also member of the Royal Holland Society of Sciences and Humanities (KHMW). He was elected member of the Academia Europaea in 2018. He is a member of the CEIRR Center coordinated at the Icahn School of Medicine at Mount Sinai in New York City and received the M.W. Beijerinck Virology Prize, awarded by the Royal Netherlands Academy of Arts and Sciences (KNAW), in 2023. Fouchier is a web-of-science Highly Cited author.

== Selected publications ==
Human metapneumovirus: A newly discovered human pneumovirus isolated from young children with respiratory tract disease van den Hoogen BG, de Jong JC, Groen J, Kuiken T, de Groot R, Fouchier RA, Osterhaus AD. Nat Med. 2001 Jun;7(6):719-24. doi: 10.1038/89098. PMID 11385510

Human coronavirus NL63: A previously undescribed coronavirus associated with respiratory disease in humans Fouchier RA, Hartwig NG, Bestebroer TM, Niemeyer B, de Jong JC, Simon JH, Osterhaus AD. Proc Natl Acad Sci U S A. 2004 Apr 20;101(16):6212-6. doi: 10.1073/pnas.0400762101. Epub 2004 Apr 8. PMID 15073334

SARS coronavirus: Aetiology: Koch's postulates fulfilled for SARS virus Fouchier RA, Kuiken T, Schutten M, van Amerongen G, van Doornum GJ, van den Hoogen BG, Peiris M, Lim W, Stöhr K, Osterhaus AD. Nature. 2003 May 15;423(6937):240. doi: 10.1038/423240a. PMID 12748632

MERS coronavirus: Isolation of a novel coronavirus from a man with pneumonia in Saudi Arabia Zaki AM, van Boheemen S, Bestebroer TM, Osterhaus AD, Fouchier RA. N Engl J Med. 2012 Nov 8;367(19):1814-20. doi: 10.1056/NEJMoa1211721. Epub 2012 Oct 17. PMID 23075143

Influenza virus H16: Characterization of a novel influenza A virus hemagglutinin subtype (H16) obtained from black-headed gulls Fouchier RA, Munster V, Wallensten A, Bestebroer TM, Herfst S, Smith D, Rimmelzwaan GF, Olsen B, Osterhaus AD. J Virol. 2005 Mar;79(5):2814-22. doi: 10.1128/JVI.79.5.2814-2822.2005. PMID 15709000

Airborne Transmission of Influenza A/H5N1 Virus Between Ferrets Herfst S, Schrauwen EJ, Linster M, Chutinimitkul S, de Wit E, Munster V, Sorrell EM, Bestebroer TM, Burke DF, Smith D, Rimmelzwaan GF, Osterhaus AD, Fouchier RA +3 authors Authors Info & Affiliations SCIENCE 22 Jun 2012 Vol 336, Issue 6088 pp. 1534-1541 DOI: 10.1126/science.1213362
