= 2015 MERS outbreak in South Korea =

Disease outbreak in South Korea

2015 Middle East respiratory syndrome outbreak in South Korea
- 2015 MERS outbreak in South Korea (South Korea) Hospital where confirmed MERS cases were exposed Location where confirmed MERS cases visited
- Date: 20 May 2015
- Location: South Korea
- Deaths: 89
- Injuries: Cases: 910

An outbreak of Middle East respiratory syndrome coronavirus occurred in South Korea from May 2015 to July 2015. The virus, which causes Middle East respiratory syndrome (MERS), was a newly emerged betacoronavirus that was first identified in a patient from Saudi Arabia in April 2012. From the outbreak, a total of 910 cases were infected in the country, with a death toll of 89.

== Outbreak ==
South Korea reported its first MERS case on 20 May 2015. A 68-year-old man returning from the Middle East was diagnosed with MERS nine days after he initially sought medical help.

The following table shows the daily statistics on the number of infected persons since 20 May 2015, based on the official report of the Central MERS Management Task Force, Ministry of Health and Welfare at the beginning of each day.

Date	Cases^{*1}^{*2}	Deaths^{*2}
20 May 2015	2	0
21 May 2015	3	0
26 May 2015	5	0
27 May 2015	5	0
28 May 2015	7	0
29 May 2015	13	0
30 May 2015	15	0
31 May 2015	18	0
1 June 2015	25	1
2 June 2015	30	1
3 June 2015	30	3
4 June 2015	36	4
5 June 2015	42	5
6 June 2015	64	5
7 June 2015	87	5
8 June 2015	95	7
9 June 2015	108	7
10 June 2015	122	9
11 June 2015	126	10
12 June 2015	138	13
13 June 2015	145	14
14 June 2015	150	16
15 June 2015	154	19
16 June 2015	162	19
17 June 2015	165	23
18 June 2015	166	24
19 June 2015	166	24
20 June 2015	169	25
21 June 2015	172	27
22 June 2015	175	27
23 June 2015	179	27
24 June 2015	180	29
25 June 2015	181	31
26 June 2015	182	31
27 June 2015	182	32
28 June 2015	182	32
29 June 2015	182	33
30 June 2015	182	33
1 July 2015	183	33
2 July 2015	184	33
3 July 2015	185	33
4 July 2015	186	33
5 July 2015	186	33
6 July 2015	186	33
7 July 2015	186	35
8 July 2015	186	35
9 July 2015	186	35
10 July 2015	186	36
11 July 2015	186	36
12 July 2015	186	36
13 July 2015	186	36
14 July 2015	186	36
15 July 2015	186	36
16 July 2015	186	36
17 July 2015	186	36
18 July 2015	186	36
19 July 2015	186	36
20 July 2015	186	36
21 July 2015	186	36
22 July 2015	186	36
23 July 2015	186	36
24 July 2015	186	36
25 July 2015	186	36
26 July 2015	186	36
27 July 2015	186	36
28 July 2015 ~ 24 October 2015	186	36
25 October 2015	186	37
26 October 2015 ~ 24 November 2015	186	37
25 November 2015	186	38
26 November 2015 ~ 28 September 2016	186	38

^*1 Includes a case reported in China

^*2 Parentheses indicate interim value

2015 MERS outbreak in South Korea

MERS confirmed cases status

MERS quarantine status

=== Main transmission route and event timeline ===
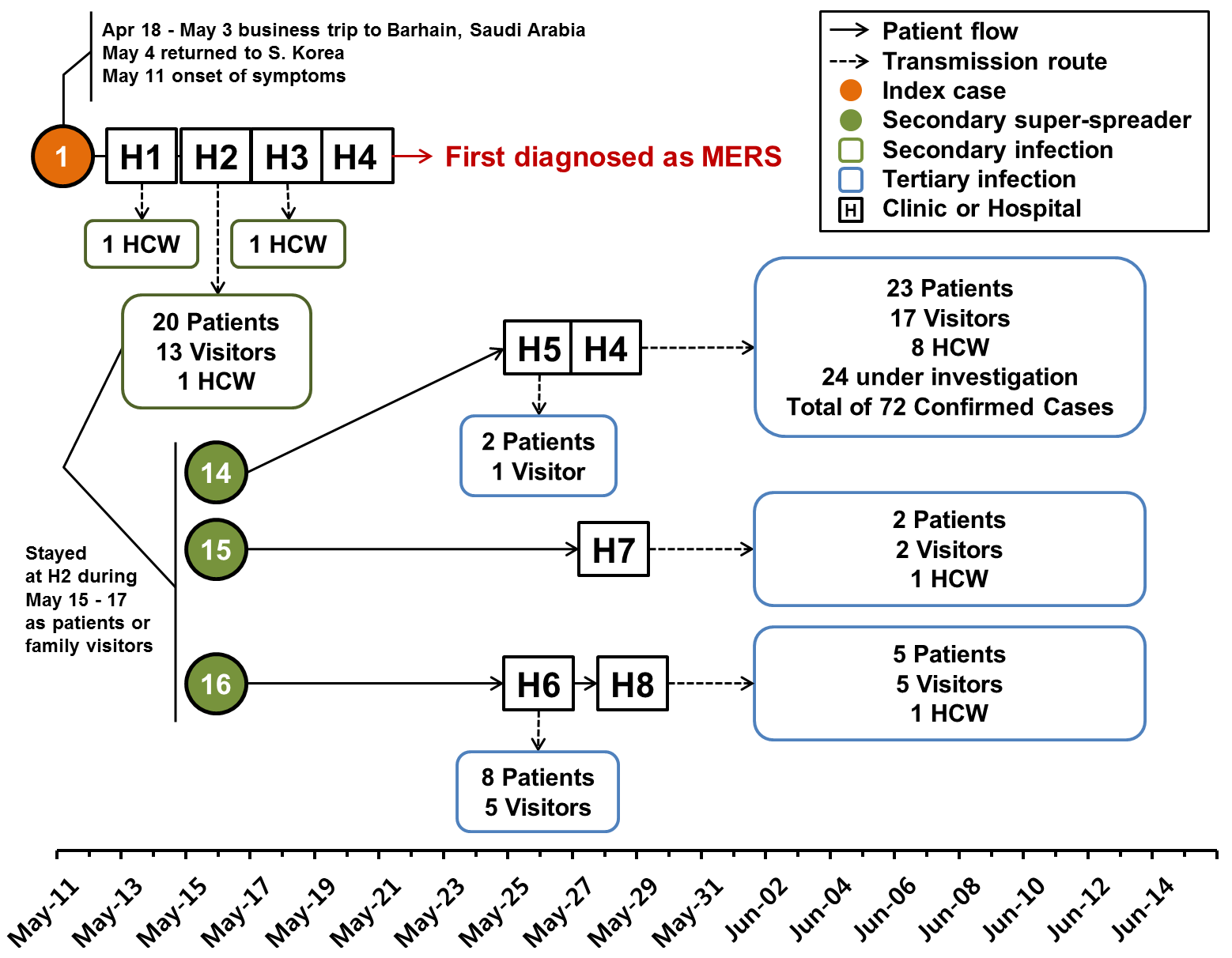
MERS-CoV, 2015, South Korea Key (see also within diagram): H hospital / clinic HCW health care worker circled number patient case number Dates are dates of diagnosis

== Government reaction ==
The Korean Ministry of Health and Welfare initially withheld details from the public, as identifying the medical institution treating a MERS patient might cause unnecessary anxiety to its other patients. This policy lacked public acceptance, and was heavily criticized as preventing the Ministry from properly notifying hospitals and municipal governments. On 3 June, it was found that the Ministry had not notified the Incheon municipal government of the transfer of an infected patient to its local medical institution. The following day the Seoul municipal government announced that it had learned by chance, through an official attending a meeting, that a hospital doctor, who began to show symptoms on 29 May and tested positive on 1 June, had been moving freely within the city and had attended a gathering of 1,565 people in Gaepo-dong on 30 May. The municipal government obtained a list of the 1,565; the Ministry proposed to undertake "passive surveillance"; the municipal government rejected this as "lukewarm" and intervened directly: initially by contacting those listed.

On 7 June, after 2,361 people were isolated, 64 patients were confirmed infected and 5 had died, the central government finally disclosed the names of MERS-exposed medical institutions.

== Hospitals ==
On 7 June 2015, the South Korean government released the names of 24 MERS-affected hospitals to the public. These hospitals include the Pyeongtaek St. Mary's (SeongMo) Hospital (평택성모병원) and the Seoul Samsung Hospital (삼성서울병원), an affiliate of Samsung Medical Center.

Hospitals where confirmed MERS cases were exposed, as of 12 July 2015, 11:00
Hospital	Korean name	City/Province	No. of cases
Samsung Medical Center	삼성서울병원	Gangnam-gu/ Seoul	90
Pyeongtaek St. Mary's Hospital	평택성모병원	Pyeongtaek/ Gyeonggi Province	37
Dae Cheong Hospital	대청병원	Seo-gu/ Daejeon	14
KonYang University Hospital	건양대학교병원	Seo-gu/ Daejeon	11
Hallym University Medical Centre	한림대학교동탄성심병원	Hwaseong/ Gyeonggi Province	6
Gangdong Gyeonghee University Hospital	강동경희대학교의대병원	Gangdong-gu/ Seoul	5
Gunguk University Hospital	건국대병원	Gwangjin-gu/ Seoul	4
Pyeongtaek Good Morning Hospital	평택굿모닝병원	Pyeongtaek/ Gyeonggi Province	4
Asan Seoul Clinic	아산서울의원	Asan / Chungnam Province	1
Yangji Samsung Medical Center	양지 서울삼성의원	Yongin/ Gyeonggi Province	1
365 Yeol Lin Clinic	365 열린의원	Gangdong-gu/ Seoul	1
Yeouido St. Mary's Hospital	가톨릭대학교 여의도성모병원	Yeongdeungpo-gu/ Seoul	1
Asan Medical Center	서울아산병원	Songpa-gu/ Seoul	1
Good gang-an Hospital	좋은강안병원	Suyeong-gu/ Busan	1
Dr. Song Clinic	송태의 내과	Songpa-gu/ Seoul	1
Others (outside hospitals, under investigation)			7
Total			186

== Related incidents ==
A 44-year-old South Korean man travelled to Huizhou, China via Hong Kong, on business, on 26 May, contrary to a doctor's advice and in breach of a self-quarantine order from the government: his father and elder sister were both confirmed infected by MERS. He was later found to have a fever, and was subsequently confirmed infected. He was suspected of dishonestly failing to disclose to Hong Kong border quarantine officers that he had visited his father in hospital on 16 May for nearly 4 hours.

On 30 May 2015, a website said that a driver in Huizhou who transported a South Korean male MERS patient was suspected to be infected but later the government clarified that this was a rumor.

A Chinese fugitive who stayed in South Korea for 3 years turned himself in as he was afraid of the outbreak. He arrived at Dalian Zhoushuizi International Airport on 4 June.

On 8 June 2015, a South Korean couple who did not follow the self-quarantine notice were found to have visited the Philippines on 6 June. They had visited the respective clinics in Sunchang County where a 72-year-old woman was confirmed positive for MERS after having visited the clinic for lumbago treatment. The couple said that they only knew that the 72-year-old woman was a MERS-positive patient only after reading the news.

On 9 June 2015, two Hong Kong students from City University of Hong Kong doing a three-month exchange program in Sungkyunkwan University were ordered by a professor to get out of the classroom as they refused to remove their protective masks. The professor also said that they were too sensitive to the outbreak because of the history of SARS in Hong Kong in 2003. Sungkyunkwan University replied that some professors saw wearing masks as impolite and said if students insist on wearing masks, they might be refused to give presentations in class and may be unable to graduate due to this. Affected students said this reflected that the South Korean public was not attentive to the threat of the MERS outbreak.

On 25 June, a South Korean man who had been treated at a Chinese hospital after being diagnosed with the MERS virus in late May, was released from the hospital and returned to South Korea.

== Effects ==
=== Education ===
The following table shows the number of schools that temporarily closed due to the outbreak:

Date	Number of schools closed
2 June 2015	84
3 June 2015	214
4 June 2015	1,162
5 June 2015	1,317
7 June 2015	1,381 (7 in Gyeonggi Province)
8 June 2015	1,970
9 June 2015	2,208
15 June 2015	475

=== Economy ===
On 11 June 2015, South Korea's central bank the interest rate from 1.75% to 1.5% to soften the financial impact of the outbreak

South Korea's department store sales decreased by 16.5% compared to the same period last year, and retail shops also decreased 3.4%, according to the Minister of Strategy and Finance, as of 17 June 2015.

As of 17 June 2015, 100,000 tourist visits to the nation had been cancelled.

=== Testing infrastructure ===
After the outbreak, South Korea developed a system to rapidly expand testing capabilities during future disease outbreaks. This has been credited as a reason for South Korea's widespread testing and effective response to the COVID-19 pandemic.

== See also ==
- South Korea foot-and-mouth outbreak
