= Vincent Racaniello =

American biologist

Vincent R. Racaniello
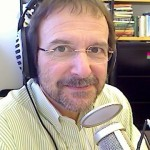
- Born: January 2, 1953 (age 73); Paterson, New Jersey
- Education: Cornell University (B.A.) (1974); Mount Sinai Medical Center (Ph.D) (1980); MIT (Post-doctoral)
- Known for: CD155 (poliovirus receptor, PVR)
- Scientific career
- Fields: Microbiology; Immunology; Virology
- Workplaces: Columbia University College of Physicians & Surgeons

Vincent R. Racaniello (born January 2, 1953) is a Higgins Professor in the Department of Microbiology and Immunology at Columbia University's College of Physicians and Surgeons. He is a co-author of a textbook on virology, Principles of Virology.

Racaniello has received the Irma T. Hirschl, Searle Scholars, Eli Lilly, Julius Youngner and NIH Merit awards. He has also been a Harvey Society Lecturer at Rockefeller University, the Hilleman Lecturer at the University of Chicago, and university lecturer at Columbia University. Spring of 2022, ETH Zurich awarded Racaniello the Richard R. Ernst award and lecture for his scientific communication work. He was also the keynote speaker for the American Society for Virology, at its 2018 meeting. Racaniello has served on the editorial boards of scientific journals, including the Journal of Virology, and is a community editor for the open access journal PLOS Pathogens. He also served as the 2015 president of the American Society for Virology.

Racaniello is the host of various podcasts, including This Week in Virology.

== Early life and education ==
Racaniello was born in Paterson, New Jersey. He graduated from Cornell University in 1974 (BA, biological sciences) and completed his PhD in the laboratory of Peter Palese in 1980, studying genetic reassortment of influenza virus. As a post-doctoral fellow in David Baltimore's laboratory at the Massachusetts Institute of Technology (1979–1982), Racaniello used recombinant DNA technology to clone and sequence the genome of the small RNA animal virus poliovirus. Using these tools, he generated the first infectious clone of an animal RNA virus. Construction of the infectious clone revolutionized modern virology.

== Research ==
Racaniello established his own research laboratory at Columbia University in the fall of 1982. The aim of his laboratory is to understand replication and pathogenesis of small RNA animal viruses, picornaviruses. The reproductive cycle of a virus begins with its attachment to and entry into the cytoplasm of a cell. His laboratory identified CD155 (poliovirus receptor, PVR); a cell surface protein, and member of the immunoglobin superfamily as the protein that mediates this process. Understanding how the interaction between virus and cell alters the viral particle and how virus entry is facilitated by the interaction has helped understand the means by which poliovirus infection is initiated.

Humans are the only known natural host for poliovirus. The study of viral disease is therefore only feasible with the generation of a small animal model. Though not susceptible to poliovirus infection, murine cells do allow for efficient replication of poliovirus RNA introduced into the cytoplasm. Taking advantage of this observation, Racaniello's laboratory constructed the first small animal model of poliomyelitis. Mice producing the human CD155 protein were generated and infected with poliovirus. These mice exhibited all symptoms and pathology of poliomyelitis observed in humans, including flaccid paralysis and spinal cord lesions. These mice today are used not only to continue to understand poliovirus pathogenesis but as a means to test the safety of stocks of the polio vaccine.

Poliomyelitis is a disease of the central nervous system; however, it is believed that CD155 is present on the surface of most if not all cells of the body. An element present within the virus RNA was hypothesized to govern viral tropism which tissues the virus infected. Newborn mice producing PVR were infected with wild-type poliovirus and a chimeric poliovirus in which this element was replaced with the same region from hepatitis C virus, a liver specific virus, or coxsackievirus B3, a virus that infects the heart or meninges. Mice infected with any of these viruses exhibited symptoms of poliomyelitis. Therefore, this region of poliovirus does not determine tissue tropism of the virus.

Secretion of interferon is one means the body uses to ward off pathogens, including viral diseases. However, poliovirus is able to replicate when interferon is added to medium used to culture mammalian cells. Racaniello's laboratory believes that this resistance is dictated by the 2A protein of poliovirus. Racaniello's laboratory continues to investigate how poliovirus circumvents the immune response of the host, enhancing our understanding of its pathogenesis and why it is a disease of the central nervous system.

== Research after poliovirus ==
Even though global eradication of poliovirus was initiated in 1988, and poliovirus infection continues throughout the world today, Racaniello's laboratory has begun to investigate the reproductive cycle and pathogenesis of other picornaviruses similar to poliovirus. These viruses include enteroviruses D68 (EV-D68) and 70 (EV70), human rhinovirus, coxsackievirus A21 and echovirus 1. Infectious clones of EV70 and several serotypes of rhinoviruses were generated. These reagents have been used to understand how host range of a virus can be altered and to identify cellular proteins necessary for replication of the viral RNA. Racaniello has also begun to study how these viruses evade the host innate immune system, in particular interferon type I response. Infection of cultured cells with human rhinovirus 1A results in the cleavage of the integral component IPS-1 (MAVS, Cardif). In addition a small animal model of virus echovirus 1 pathogenesis has been established.

Racaniello is also interested in picornavirus evolution and movement. To this means, he intends to isolate and identify picornaviruses found in the wild throughout the Northeastern United States.

Racaniello's laboratory continues to pursue the fundamental principles of virus biology. Together with a long-term collaborator, Racaniello's lab has determined that neurotropism of Zika virus and enterovirus D 68 are not a recently acquired phenotypes. Results from their studies examining Zika virus infection of the neonatal mouse brain revealed that cortical developmental pathologies associated with virus infection may result from architecture defects of the developing brain. Data from their research understanding the mechanism of enterovirus D68 associated acute flaccid myelitis suggests multiple means by which paralysis may result from virus infection.

In collaboration with members of the Center for Infection and Immunology at Columbia, Rosenfeld and Racaniello described a cross-reactive anti-enterovirus antibody response. These results challenge the idea that enterovirus infections are modulated solely by a homotypic humoral immune response.

== Science beyond the laboratory ==
Understanding that the World Wide Web is a primary scientific tool, Racaniello is one of the co-creators of BioCrowd, a social network designed to bring together scientists of all disciplines. Racaniello's virology blog, and podcasts This Week in Virology; This Week in Parasitism with colleagues Dickson Despommier and Daniel O. Griffin; This Week in Microbiology with Michelle Swanson, Michael Schmidt, Petra Levin and Elio Schaechter; This Week in Evolution with Nels Elde; Immune with Stephanie Langel, Brianne Barker and Cynthia Leifer; and This Week in Neuroscience also unify science with technology. His blog, podcasts, specialized pages on Influenza 101 and Virology 101 aim to bring microbiology to non-scientists. Continuing to bring virology to those outside of the field, Racaniello established a library containing podcasts of lectures he has recently given at Columbia University. He has also begun teaching virology via livestream on YouTube. Additionally, every Wednesday evening with Amy Rosenfeld, Racaniello conducts a livestream "Q&A with A&V: Answering your COVID-19 questions". He also has a new weekly livestream show "Office Hours with Earth's Virology Professor".

== Patents ==
Racaniello is listed as inventor on at least 12 patents.
