= Kathy Spindler =

American virologist

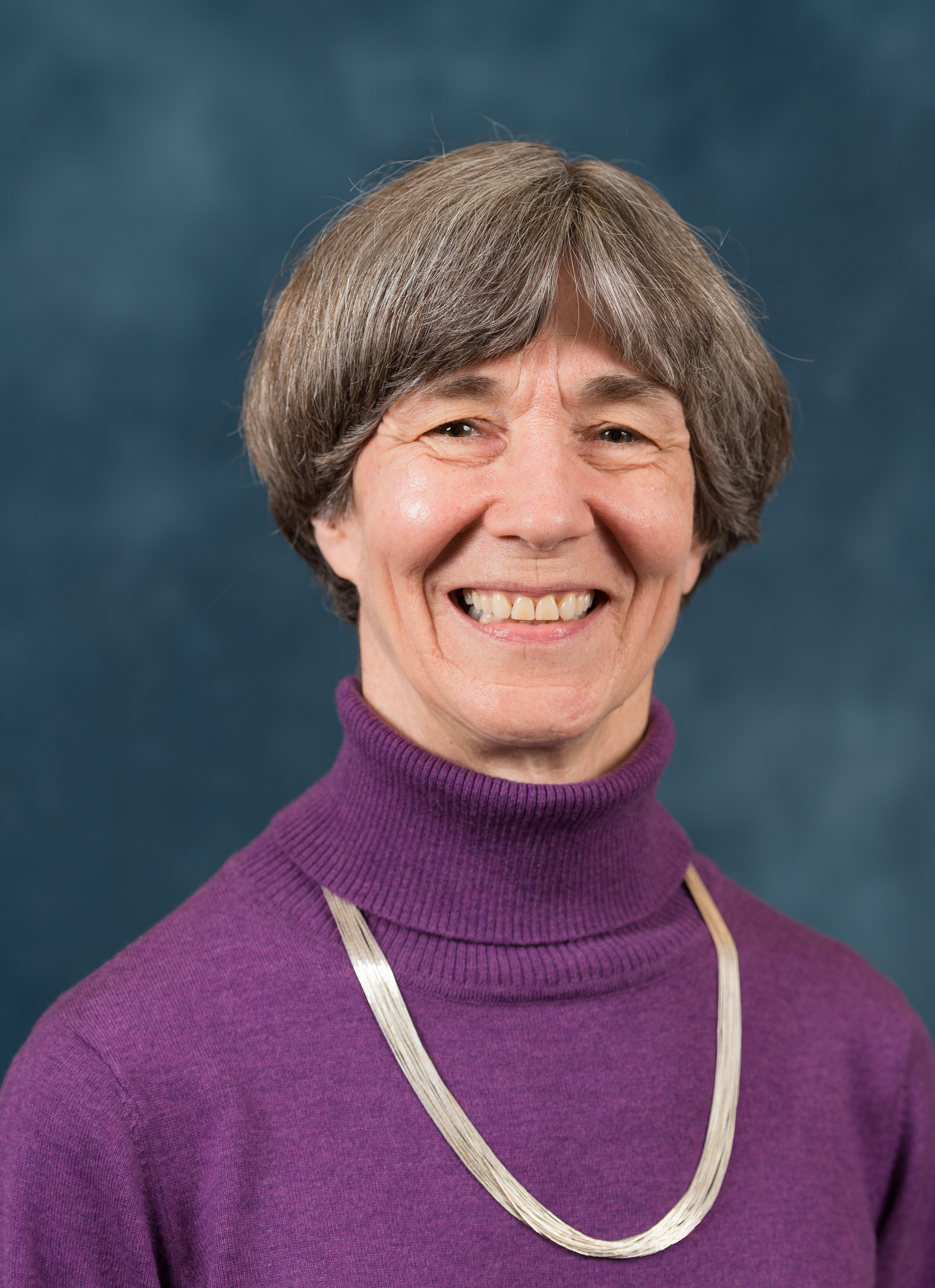

Katherine R. (Kathy) Spindler, Ph.D., is an American virologist who is a co-host of the podcast This Week in Virology along with colleagues Vincent Racaniello, Brianne Barker, Rich Condit, Alan Dove, Angela Mingarelli, Jolene Ramsey, and the late Dickson Despommier.

Spindler, born 1 December 1953, is Professor Emerita at the University of Michigan Medicine, specializing in adenoviruses. She has also worked on rhabdoviruses, bunyaviruses, and the bacteriophage phi X 174.

She was awarded the American Society for Virology Wolfgang and Patricia Joklik Distinguished Service Award in 2003.

As a senior scientist, Spindler has been recognized as a Fellow of both the American Association for the Advancement of Science and the American Academy of Microbiology, the leadership group of the American Society for Microbiology.

She served as secretary-treasurer of the American Society for Virology from 2004-2017. She taught undergraduate and graduate students and guided research in the Spindler Lab at the University of Michigan (2001-2024) and the University of Georgia (1985-2001).
