= D68 =

D68 may refer to:

- D. 68, String Quartet No. 5 in B-flat major, composed by Franz Schubert in 1813
- D-68, a Soviet 115mm tank gun.
- D68 enterovirus, a member of the family Picornaviridae
- HMAS Vampire (D68), V-class destroyer of the Royal Navy (RN) and Royal Australian Navy (RAN)
- HMS Barrosa (D68), later or 1943 Battle-class fleet destroyer of the Royal Navy
- HMS Gibraltar (D68), British large aircraft carrier design of World War II

== See also ==
- 2014 enterovirus D68 outbreak
