= Daniel Griffin =

Daniel or Danny Griffin may refer to:

- Daniel T. Griffin (1911–1941), aviation machinist's mate first class in U.S. Navy
- Daniel J. Griffin (1880–1926), U.S. representative from New York
- Danny Griffin (footballer) (born 1977), Northern Irish footballer
- Danny Griffin (soccer) (born 1998), American soccer player
- Danny Griffin (actor), English actor, model, and stuntman
- Daniel O. Griffin, immunologist
- Dan Griffin, former member of Canadian rock band Arkells
