= Acute hemorrhagic conjunctivitis =

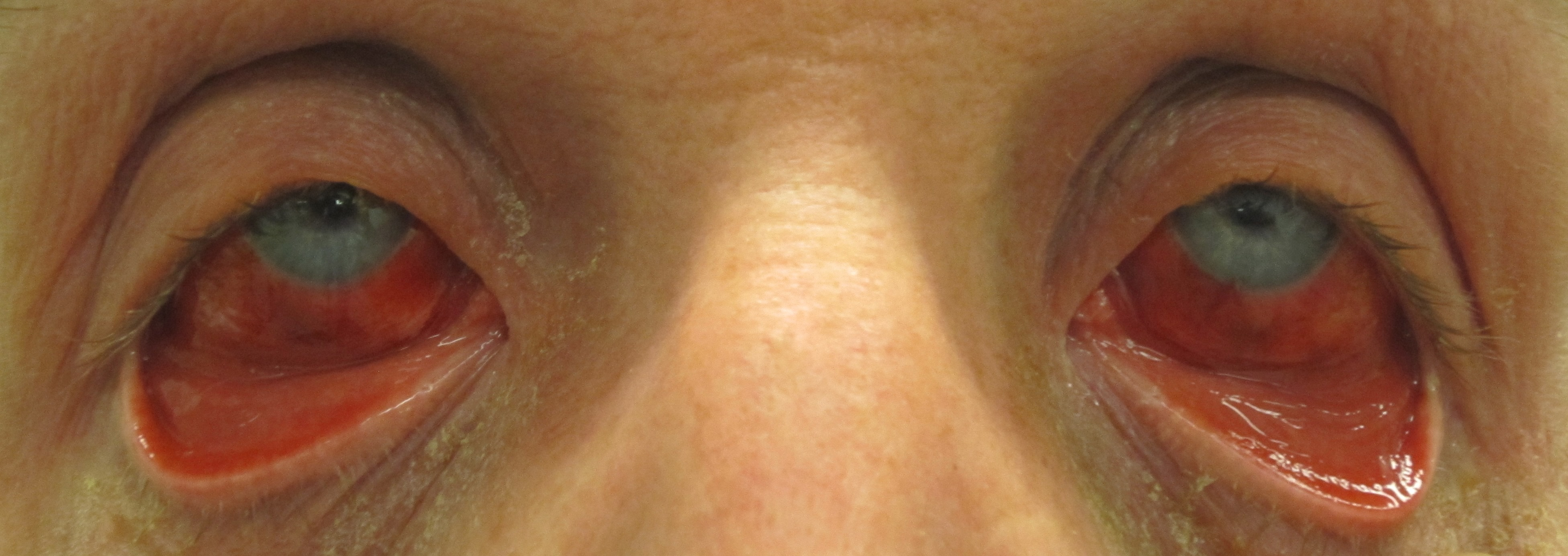
- Acute hemorrhagic conjunctivitis with the eyelid pulled down for a more complete view
- Specialty: Infectious diseases

Acute hemorrhagic conjunctivitis (AHC) (also spelled acute haemorrhagic conjunctivitis) is a derivative of the highly contagious conjunctivitis virus, otherwise known as pink eye. Symptoms include excessively red, swollen eyes as well as subconjunctival hemorrhaging. Currently, there is no known treatment and patients are required to merely endure the symptoms while the virus runs its five- to seven-day course. While it was first identified in Ghana, the virus has now been seen in China, India, Egypt, Cuba, Singapore, Taiwan, Japan, Pakistan, Thailand, and the United States.

== Signs and symptoms ==
The conjunctiva provides lining for the inside of the eyelid as well as a coating for the sclera, the white portion of the eyeball. It typically serves to provide lubrication for the eye through the production of mucus and tears. When infected with AHC, patients will experience painful, red eyes, swelling of the conjunctival tissue, and frequent mucus discharge from the eyes accompanied by excessive tearing and subconjunctival hemorrhaging. This hemorrhaging is caused by the rupture of blood vessels beneath the conjunctiva giving the eyes a bright red appearance. Some patients also experience blurry vision and fever in addition to the common symptoms and one in every ten thousand cases exhibits paralysis similar to that of polio.

== Cause ==
There are three main viruses that have been studied and confirmed as the agents responsible for AHC, including enterovirus 70, coxsackievirus A24 variant (CA24v) and adenovirus 11.

AHC can only exist in a human host and is transmitted through human contact with an infected individual or object, such as a towel used by an infected person. It is also easily communicable through fecal-oral pathways, thus allowing for its abundance in areas of the world with low levels of hygiene. Within one to two days of infection, symptoms will begin to become apparent.

=== Enterovirus 70 ===
Enterovirus 70 is a member of the genus of viruses called Enterovirus and family of the viruses Picornaviridae. Usually very small (about 30 nm in diameter), it is non-enveloped (meaning it only has a nucleic acid core and protein capsid) and has a single-stranded positive-sense RNA genome; the protein capsid the virus itself is surrounded by is icosahedral. It is known as one of the newer enteroviruses within this category. It spreads easily from one person's eyes to another's through contact with infected objects, like fingers, or through the eye secretion itself. Enterovirus 70 infrequently causes polio-like permanent paralysis.

=== Coxsackievirus A24 variant ===
The Coxsackievirus is another member of the genus of viruses called Enterovirus and family of the viruses Picornaviridae. Its isolation host is human. It is an antigenic variant of the Coxsackievirus A24. It was studied independently for the first time in Singapore in 1970.

=== Adenovirus 11 ===
Adenoviruses are a medium-sized variant that are nonenveloped, like Enterovirus 70. They have a double-stranded linear DNA genome. There are 57 variants of this virus, that each cause 5-10% of upper respiratory infections in humans. These viruses are some of the largest nonenveloped viruses in existence, and because of this, they can pass through the endosome without any necessary envelope fusion.

== Treatment ==
There is no treatment currently available. The virus generally resolves itself within a five to seven day period. The use of steroids can actually cause a corneal microbial superinfection which then requires antimicrobial therapy to eliminate.
