= Acute flaccid myelitis =

Condition of the spinal cord with symptoms of rapid onset of arm or leg weakness

- Other names: Acute flaccid paralysis with anterior myelitis, polio-like syndrome
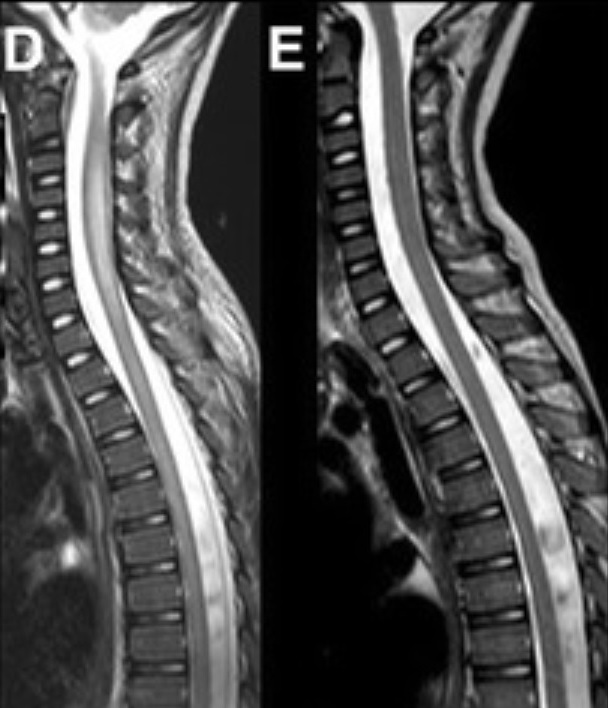
- Magnetic resonance imaging of the spinal cord in a case of AFM showing cord swelling in (d) which has resolved three weeks later in (e).
- Specialty: Neurology
- Symptoms: Weakness, decreased reflexes, trouble swallowing or speaking
- Complications: Trouble breathing, urinary retention
- Usual onset: Rapid
- Causes: Generally unknown; thought to be caused by viral infection
- Diagnostic method: Medical imaging, nerve conduction studies, cerebral spinal fluid testing
- Differential diagnosis: Transverse myelitis, Guillain–Barré syndrome, acute disseminated encephalomyelitis
- Treatment: Supportive care, physical therapy, mechanical ventilation
- Prognosis: Variable
- Frequency: Rare

Acute flaccid myelitis (AFM) is a serious condition of the spinal cord. Symptoms include rapid onset of arm or leg weakness and decreased reflexes. Difficulty moving the eyes, speaking, or swallowing may also occur. Occasionally, numbness or pain may be present. Complications can include trouble breathing.

The cause of most cases is unclear as of 2018. More than 90% of recent cases have followed a mild viral infection such as from enteroviruses. While polio can cause AFM, since 2014, it has not been involved in cases in the United States. The underlying mechanism involves damage to the spinal cord's grey matter. Diagnosis may be supported by medical imaging of the spine, nerve conduction studies, and cerebrospinal fluid testing.

Treatment involves supportive care. Physical therapy may be recommended. Occasionally, mechanical ventilation is required to support breathing. Outcomes are variable. The condition is rare and occurs most commonly in children. Fewer than one in 500,000 children is affected per year in the United States. Although the illness is not new, an increase in cases has been seen since 2014 in the United States. In 2018, 233 cases were confirmed in the United States.

== Signs and symptoms ==
Signs and symptoms include:

- Difficulty moving the eyes or drooping eyelids
- Facial droop or weakness
- Difficulty with swallowing or slurred speech
- Sudden arm or leg weakness

A summary of the condition by the Centers for Disease Control and Prevention (CDC) in 2014:

Common features included acute focal limb weakness and specific findings on magnetic resonance imaging (MRI) of the spinal cord consisting of nonenhancing lesions largely restricted to the grey matter. In most cases, these lesions spanned more than one level of the spinal cord. Some also had acute cranial nerve dysfunction with correlating nonenhancing brainstem lesions on MRI. None of the children experienced altered mental status or seizures. None had any cortical, subcortical, basal ganglial, or thalamic lesions on MRI. Most children reported a febrile respiratory illness in the two weeks preceding development of neurologic symptoms. In most cases, cerebrospinal fluid (CSF) analyses demonstrated mild-moderate pleocytosis (increased cell count in the CSF) consistent with an inflammatory or infectious process.

== Causes ==
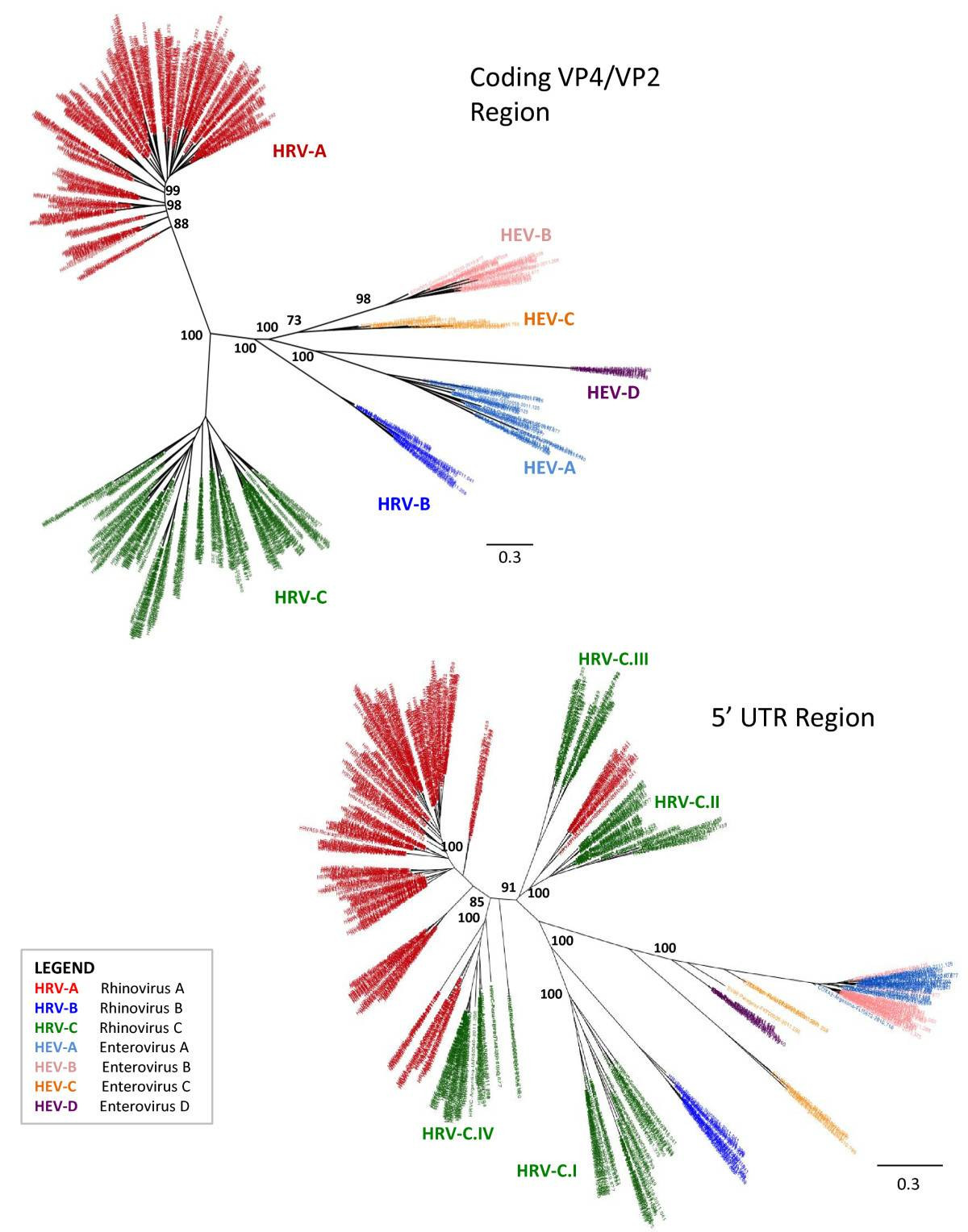
Maximum likelihood phylogenetic trees of enterovirus species A, B, C, D and rhinovirus A, B, or C isolates from Latin America: The 5'UTR region is much more affected by recombination events than the VP4/VP2 coding sequence. Polio is in the enterovirus C species; enterovirus 71, a strain of enterovirus A, has been reported to cause rare neurological complications; the suspected cause of the 2014 cases is a strain of enterovirus D. Most enteroviruses and rhinoviruses cause only common cold symptoms.

As of October 2018, the U.S. CDC regarded the cause of AFM as having "a variety of possible causes such as viruses, environmental toxins, and genetic disorders", listing poliovirus, nonpolio enteroviruses, West Nile virus, and adenoviruses among the potential causes. More than 90% of people with AFM reported having symptoms consistent with a mild viral infection before the onset of AFM.

Much research has focused on the nonpolio enteroviruses 68 (EV-D68) and 71 (EV-A71), a common cause of hand, foot, and mouth disease in infants and young children, members of the enterovirus D and enterovirus A species, respectively, as suspected causes. Some evidence supports a causal role of EV-D68. Coxsackievirus A16 may also play a role in some cases.

A 2014 Morbidity and Mortality Weekly Report report noted the difficulty of establishing causation by the virus. Avindra Nath, clinical director of the National Institute of Neurological Disorders and Stroke and president of the International Society for NeuroVirology, compared the situation to the prolonged investigations that led to confirmation of HIV as the cause of AIDS. In response to the suggestion that the enterovirus might be taking over the role of polio, Nath said that EV-D68 was far less virulent and spread much more slowly than polio, and that, unlike in polio, only a few cases of paralysis were seen per thousand children infected. He also suggested that adults with respiratory diseases should be evaluated for neurological deficits, and that infectious diseases should be considered as a cause when patients present with neurological symptoms.

A subsequent report described 29 cases of EV-D68-associated AFM in Europe in 2016, noting, "these probably represent only the tip of the iceberg".

CDC sees 2018 as a record year; annual documented cases of AFM reached a record 238 nationwide. The relatively lower circulation in 2020 may reflect the use of COVID-19 pandemic infection mitigation measures.

Because of the EV-D68 surge in 2022 Health Alert Network (HAN) released a notice for Healthcare providers and hospitals. The CDC warned clinicians that EV-D68 detections have continued to be high. "Sentinel surveillance sites are reporting a higher proportion of EV-D68 positivity in children who are [rhinovirus and/or enterovirus] positive compared to previous years," the agency wrote. Clinicians should be aware of "the potential for an increase in AFM cases in the upcoming weeks." CDC urges healthcare providers to consider EV-D68 as a possible cause of acute, severe respiratory illness and a potential increase in AFM cases.

== Diagnosis ==
AFM is diagnosed by examining a person's nervous system in combination with reviewing images of the spinal cord. A doctor can examine a person's nervous system and the places on the body where he or she has weakness, poor muscle tone, and decreased reflexes. In addition, a doctor can do magnetic resonance imaging to look at a person's brain and spinal cord, do laboratory tests on the cerebrospinal fluid (CSF, the fluid around the brain and spinal cord), and may check nerve conduction (impulse sent along a nerve fiber) and response.

Diagnosis of AFM requires an acute onset of limb paralysis and at least one gray-matter spinal-cord lesion. CSF should show pleocytosis.

== Prevention ==
The CDC recommends, "To prevent infections in general, persons should stay home if they are ill, wash their hands often with soap and water, avoid close contact (such as touching and shaking hands) with those who are ill, and clean and disinfect frequently touched surfaces."

== Treatment ==
Treatment involves supportive care. Physical therapy may be recommended. Occasionally mechanical ventilation is required to support breathing.

If immunoglobulin, corticosteroids, plasma exchange, or antiviral medication are useful is unclear.

== Outcomes ==
Studies from 2014 to 2017 indicated a poor outcome for many cases. Seven of 61 cases with EVD68 detected and eight long-term follow-ups had full recovery; two deaths were described in severely immunocompromised people (one with EVD68 and one with both EVD68 and coxsackie A16 detected).

Six of 10 children in Denver were sent home for outpatient treatment. Some of the children with mild and moderate cases have recovered partially from temporary limb weakness but still have permanent weakness, whereas those with more severe cases have not recovered as much. Intensive physical therapy and occupational therapy may be beneficial for recovery.

== Epidemiology ==
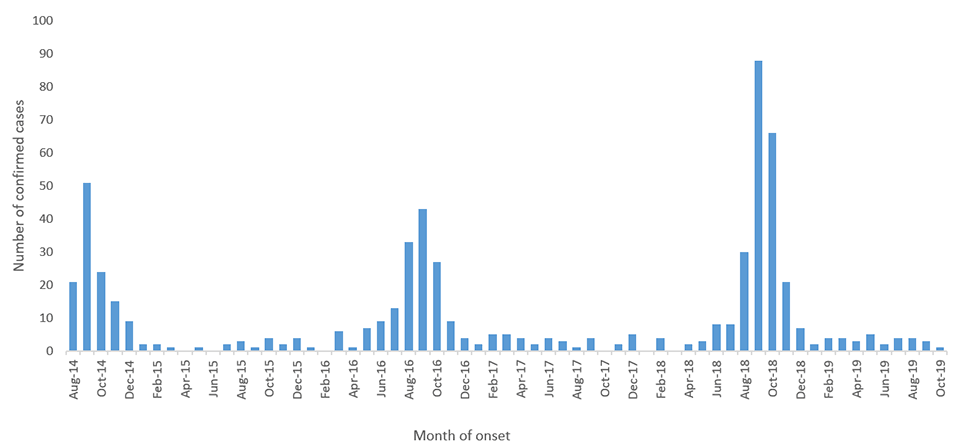
Graph showing the seasonal nature of the occurrence of AFM: Notable increases occurred in the late summers of 2014, 2016, and 2018.

A seasonal pattern is seen in outbreaks, with a marked increase in cases reported in the late summer and early fall.

The CDC has determined and submitted to GenBank complete or nearly complete genomic sequences for three known strains of the virus, which are "genetically related to strains of EV-D68 virus that were detected in previous years in the United States, Europe, and Asia."

While rates of paralytic symptoms appear to be correlated with the number of respiratory infections, in initial anecdotal reports, the cases are not clustered within a family or school, suggesting that the paralysis, per se, is not directly contagious, but arises as a very rare complication of the common respiratory infection.

Cases of similar illnesses have been reported in Canada, Northern Europe, and Japan. Over 90% of reported cases are in children.

== History ==
AFM has only been formally tracked since 2014, since the incidence has spiked in recent years.

A group in Texas reported having observed a pattern in 2013 of one to four cases per year with similar polio-like characteristics.

In 2014, the CDC Morbidity and Mortality Weekly Report and a CDC Clinician Outreach and Communication Activity (COCA) conference call, noted that many cases had neck, back, or extremity pain, but otherwise those affected generally had normal sensation in their limbs. A few participants in the conference call discussed whether pain, later abating, might precede the onset of paralysis.

An October 2014 report described outbreaks in California and Colorado, suggesting that the number of cases might be 100 or more nationwide. Diagnosis included a detailed medical history, MRI imaging, and the elimination of transverse myelitis or Guillain–Barré syndrome as potential causes. Physicians were using an online mailing list to communicate about similar cases in Alabama and Kansas. The largest known cluster of cases was in Colorado, with 29 total, 12 of whom had been reported from August onwards of that year.

Three of four cases treated in Alabama involved a complete inability to move one arm, reminiscent of peripheral nerve injury:

The three cases since August really look like each other. They have severe arm flaccidity and no mental status changes. All of them have similar spine MRIs showing gray-matter involvement. You could lay all three MRIs on top of each other, and they look almost the same. It's pretty striking. ... If you lift the arm up, it literally drops. Sensation is usually intact. There might be slightly decreased sensation in the other arm, but these are younger kids, so they're not always so cooperative in giving you a good sensory exam.

Children's Mercy Hospital, which had three or four cases in 2014, reported that the MRI images and symptoms closely mimicked polio. They reported: "The sudden onset of flaccid paralysis in single or multiple limbs with absolutely no sensory findings, the MRIs all showing uniformly a signal increase in the ventral horns of the spinal cord — this is exactly the same region of the spinal cord affected in polio ... Almost all of the patients have an increase in their white blood cells in the cerebrospinal fluid. Some of the patients have brainstem findings and cranial-nerve findings."

Of 64 patients meeting the CDC criteria before October 29, 2014, 80% had had a preceding respiratory illness, and 75% reported fever in the days leading up to limb weakness, the onset of which was generally abrupt. By November 20, the number of confirmed cases stood at 88 from 29 states.

The CDC requested that physicians provide information about cases meeting these criteria: patients diagnosed after August 1, 2014, who are no older than 21 years of age, showing acute onset of focal limb weakness, with a spinal-cord lesion largely restricted to grey matter visualized by MRI.

In November 2018, the CDC reported that they were investigating 286 cases, with at least 116 confirmed cases in 31 states. The CDC is setting up a task force to investigate the causes and to find treatments.
