= Viral interference =

Inhibition of virus growth caused by previous exposure of cells to another virus

Viral interference, also known as superinfection resistance, is the inhibition of viral reproduction caused by previous exposure of cells to another virus. The exact mechanism for viral interference is unknown. Factors that have been implicated are the generation of interferons by infected cells, and the occupation or down-modulation of cellular receptors.

== Overview ==
Viral interference is considered the most common outcome of coinfection, or the simultaneous infection of a host by two or more distinct viruses. The primary form of viral interference is known as superinfection exclusion, in which the initial infection stimulates a resistance to subsequent infection by related viruses. Interference can occur as well in the form of superinfection suppression, in which persistently infected cells hold off infection by unrelated viruses. Viral interference has also been observed to occur in the use of vaccines containing live-attenuated viruses, in both directions — in some cases vaccines disrupting viruses unrelated to those they were targeting, and in others wild viruses rendering vaccines of this kind less effective.

== Examples ==
=== Bacteriophage T4 ===
A primary infection by bacteriophage (phage) T4 of its E. coli host ordinarily leads to genetic exclusion of a secondarily infecting phage, preventing the secondary phage from contributing its genetic information to progeny. This viral interference depends on the expression by the primary phage of the genes immunity (imm) and spackle (sp). The imm gp appears to enable the host exonuclease V to degrade the superinfecting phage DNA, and the sp gp appears to interfere with the DNA injection process of secondary phage. If the primary infecting phage is subjected to DNA damaging treatment prior to infection, this treatment tends to permit entry of the secondary phage's DNA, thus shifting reproduction from an asexual to a sexual mode and allowing rescue of the primary phage's genes.

=== Respiratory viruses ===
Interference has been observed to occur among endemic respiratory viruses. For example, human rhinovirus (HRV) infection has been shown to reduce the likelihood of codetection of other respiratory viruses, suggesting that it may confer a protective effect against other viruses such as influenza. The mechanism at play here has been suggested to be the expression of interferon-stimulated genes in the "target tissue" of HRV infection — the epithelium of the airway, where there has been observed to be an "unexpected high prevalence" of the virus, even among asymptomatic individuals. This process thus stimulates an antiviral state, shielding nearby cells from further infection. This potential interplay between viruses such as HRV and influenza may be one factor contributing to the timing and severity of their separate though overlapping "seasons".

Interference has been reported between respiratory viruses in non-human animals as well, such as between avian influenza viruses and Newcastle disease virus in chicken, turkeys, and ducks.

=== Live-attenuated vaccines ===
The first smallpox vaccine, developed by Edward Jenner, used cowpox to prevent smallpox infection. Indeed, the term "vaccine" comes from the Latin phrase variolae vaccinae, Jenner's name for cowpox.

Live enterovirus vaccines have been found to disrupt the spread of various unrelated respiratory viruses, such as influenza, HRV, and respiratory syncytial virus (RSV), in addition to poliovirus (itself an enterovirus), a phenomenon attributed to viral interference. Similarly, during mass immunization campaigns against polio, vaccination seemed to confer some protection against unrelated enteroviruses as well. At the same time, enteroviruses were also found to interfere with the vaccines themselves, leading to instances of vaccine failure.

== History ==
Viral interference was observed as early as the 16th century. However, it was not until the 20th century that it was described in detail, following experiments involving plants in 1929, animals in 1935, and bacteriophages in 1942.

=== 2009 influenza pandemic ===
The emergence of a novel influenza A virus (pandemic H1N1/09) in early 2009 afforded the opportunity to study how pandemic influenza and seasonal respiratory viruses might interact, placing the concept of viral interference "on more solid footing." The virus quickly spread across both the Northern and Southern Hemispheres through the middle of the year. While this is an unusual time for influenza activity in the north, the first wave of the pandemic in the south occurred during the typical influenza period. The pandemic virus quickly became the dominant strain of influenza, largely displacing the seasonal ones in many countries; however, complete replacement was not observed. Ultimately, activity generally peaked at the expected time for influenza in the Southern Hemisphere.

Despite the rapid spread around the world through the middle of the year, the pandemic remained in a lull during the summer in the north following an explosive outbreak in the spring. As predicted, the virus returned in epidemic proportions in the fall, earlier than the typical flu season but at a time when respiratory illnesses are known to become more prevalent. However, in countries such as Sweden, Norway, and France, the epidemic was "delayed" relative to its timing in other countries, such as the United States and Italy. This difference was attributed by some observers to a rhinovirus epidemic that broke out upon the reopening of schools, effectively "delaying" the rise in H1N1 cases until October. Studies on this potential interaction between HRV and the pandemic influenza at times came to divergent conclusions, however. While this "delay" in countries like Sweden was real (i.e., temporally speaking, the epidemic was later than in other places), studies also showed that coinfections were relatively common and that there was active cocirculation of the two viruses.

A systematic analysis of studies from 26 countries found that the influenza epidemic delayed the onset of RSV activity by an average of 0.58 months to 2.5 months. The effect was more pronounced in the Northern Hemisphere as compared to the Southern Hemisphere, perhaps due to the timing of the influenza outbreak relative to the period of typical RSV activity in each region; the tropics, meanwhile, experienced minimal delay. This impact persisted into the second RSV season after the start of the pandemic, albeit to a lesser degree, and was no longer observed by the third season.

=== COVID-19 pandemic ===
During the COVID-19 pandemic, the circulation of many respiratory viruses changed dramatically. Amid the rapid global spread of the pandemic SARS-CoV-2 throughout 2020, these viruses, including influenza, fell to historically low levels. Influenza activity remained virtually nonexistent into 2021, when it began to be detected more frequently, but was still low during the 2021–2022 flu season. RSV activity was similarly depressed during the first year of the pandemic, before resurging in 2021. By contrast, cases of HRV and respiratory enteroviruses declined at the onset of the pandemic but soon returned to prepandemic levels, circulating relatively normally.

The above reductions have generally been attributed to the imposition of non-pharmaceutical interventions, such as social distancing, mask use, and school closures. However, viral interference has also been suggested as the driving force, or at least another driving force, behind this major decline in viral activity, based in part on the experience of the 2009 pandemic. For example, in the winter of 2021–2022, during the surge of the highly transmissible Omicron variant of SARS-CoV-2 in the United States, influenza activity plummeted as the pandemic wave grew, peaking again in the spring once Omicron had subsided. A similar phenomenon was observed in Hong Kong in March 2022, when other respiratory viruses "disappeared" during the surge before returning in April. With respect to HRV and respiratory enteroviruses, whose behavior was evidently less affected during the pandemic, an apparent interplay between these and SARS-CoV-2, possibly mediated by viral interference, was identified in some places, such as California and South Korea. Although these viruses continued to circulate at near prepandemic levels, they were found to peak when SARS-CoV-2 activity was low and to decline as SARS-CoV-2 activity increased.
