= Moselio Schaechter =

American microbiologist (1928–2025)

- Born: April 26, 1928; Milan, Italy
- Died: August 14, 2025 (aged 97)
- Scientific career
- Fields: Bacteriology, microbiology
- Institutions: Tufts University

Moselio "Elio" Schaechter (April 26, 1928 – August 14, 2025) was an Italian-born American microbiologist who was a distinguished professor emeritus at Tufts University, and adjunct professor at both San Diego State University and University of California, San Diego.

== Early life and education ==
Schaechter was born in 1928 in Milan, Italy, and was of Polish Jewish descent. His family emigrated in 1940 to Quito, Ecuador, where he was raised and educated until moving to the United States for graduate school. In Quito, he studied at Instituto Nacional Mejía, the most prestigious Ecuadorian school. He received a M.A. in bacteriology from the University of Kansas in 1952 and a PhD in microbiology from the University of Pennsylvania in 1954. He was drafted into the United States Army after graduation and worked at Walter Reed Army Institute of Research studying rickettsia. He then worked as a postdoctoral fellow at the Statens Serum Institut in Copenhagen, Denmark until 1958, studying Salmonella and Escherichia coli growth.

== Academic career ==
Returning to the United States to begin his independent research career, Schaechter spent four years at the then-new medical school at the University of Florida before moving to Tufts University, where he would remain for the following 33 years. During his tenure at Tufts, Schaechter spent 23 years serving as chair of the Department of Molecular Biology and Microbiology, became a Distinguished Professor in 1987, and received the medical students' teaching award 11 times. Schaechter retired from Tufts in 1995 and moved to San Diego, California, where he has served as an adjunct professor at San Diego State University and University of California, San Diego.

Schaechter was an Honorary Member the American Society for Microbiology, which he served as President in 1984. He has also chaired the editorial board of its newsletter, ASM News. He became a fellow of the American Academy of Microbiology in 1974, served a term as member of its board of governors from 1997 to 2000. . Schaechter has written or edited several foundational textbooks in microbiology. The ASM awards the Moselio Schaechter Distinguished Service Award to recognize society members who contribute to scientific research and science education in the developing world.

Schaechter was also involved with public outreach and science communication projects; he co-edited an ASM-sponsored microbiology-themed blog called Small Things Considered and co-hosted the This Week in Microbiology podcast founded and hosted by Vincent Racaniello. He also published work on the history of microbiology.

== Research ==
The focus of Schaechter's research group involved studying bacterial growth and cell division, with particular interest in the involvement of bacterial cell membranes in division. Among the notable discoveries of the group was the association of the E. coli origin of replication with the cell membrane when hemimethylated.

== Personal life and death ==
Schaechter married during his graduate education and he and his wife had two children. His daughter Judith Schaechter is a noted stained glass artist. After his first wife's death Schaechter remarried in 1994.

He was a hobbyist mycologist and received awards for his contributions to amateur mycology. He was active in the Boston Mycological Club for many years and was a founding member of the San Diego Mycological Society. He published a natural history book on the subject of mushrooms and mushroom-hunting, In the Company of Mushrooms, in 1997.

Schaechter died on August 14, 2025, at the age of 97.
