= Human echovirus 9 =

Echovirus 9

Virus classification
- (unranked): Virus
- Realm: Riboviria
- Kingdom: Orthornavirae
- Phylum: Pisuviricota
- Class: Pisoniviricetes
- Order: Picornavirales
- Family: Picornaviridae
- Genus: Enterovirus
- Species: Enterovirus B
- Strain: Echovirus 9

Synonyms
- E-9; A23 virus; Coxsackie A23

Strain of Enterovirus

Echovirus 9 (also known as E-9, E.C.H.O. 9, and formerly Coxsackie A23 or A23 virus) is a serotype of echovirus. When first discovered, it was labelled as a coxsackie A virus, A23. It was later discovered that A23 was an echovirus antigenically identical to the already-known echovirus 9.

Echovirus 9 is the most common enterovirus type. It is a common cause of illness in humans, although unlike many enteroviruses, it rarely infects infants. Its transmission is facilitated by crowded conditions. Those who are slightly ill and children are at particular risk of contracting echovirus 9 (A23).
