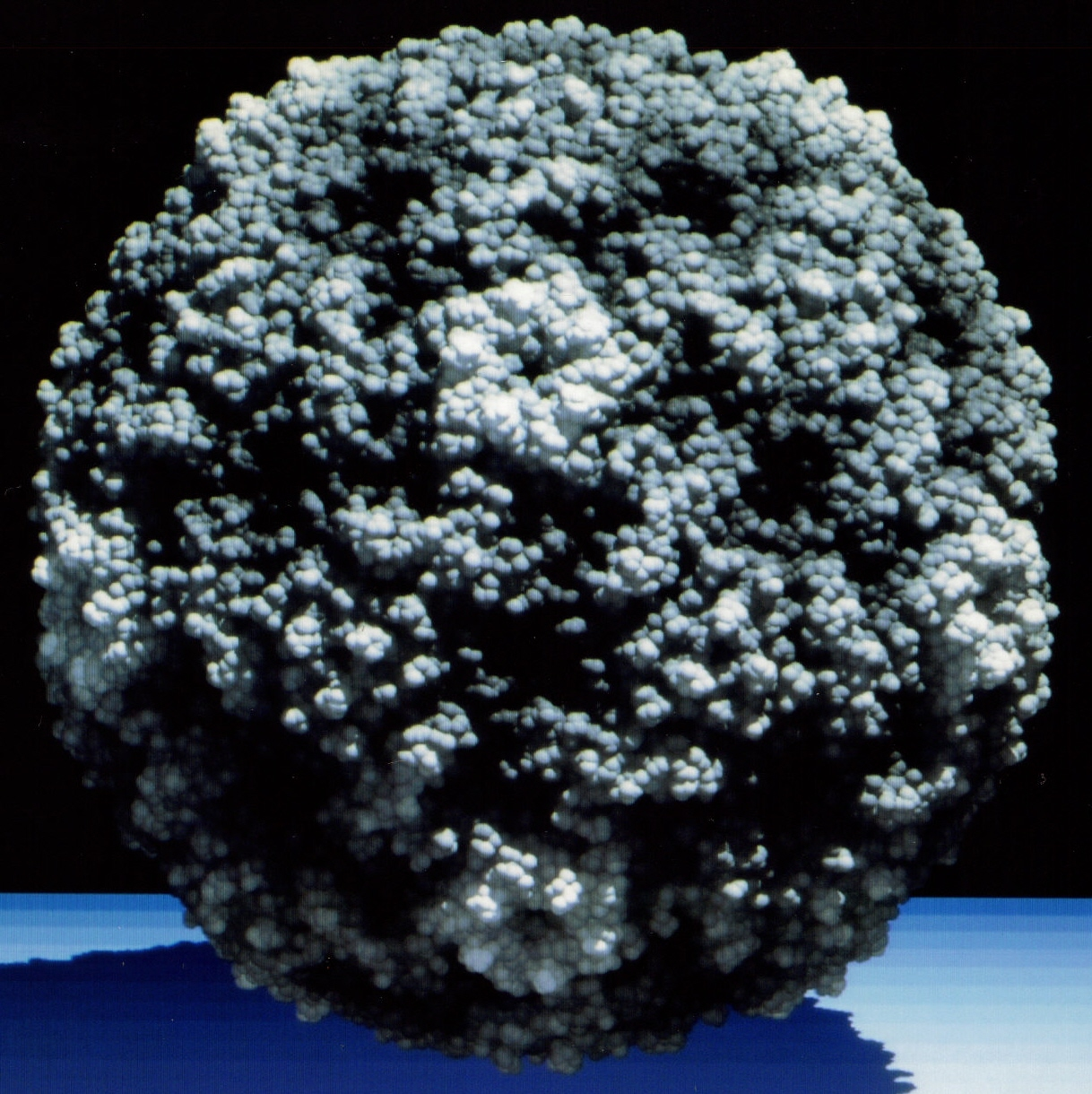
- Bovine enterovirus

Virus classification
- (unranked): Virus
- Realm: Riboviria
- Kingdom: Orthornavirae
- Phylum: Pisuviricota
- Class: Pisoniviricetes
- Order: Picornavirales
- Family: Picornaviridae
- Genus: Enterovirus
- Species: Enterovirus E

= Enterovirus E =

Species of virus

Enterovirus E (formerly bovine enterovirus (BEV)) is a picornavirus of the genus Enterovirus. The virus may also be referred to as enteric cytopathic bovine orphan virus (ECBO). It is endemic in cattle populations worldwide, and although normally fairly nonpathogenic, it can cause reproductive, respiratory, or enteric disease – particularly when the animal is concurrently infected with another pathogen.

The virus is spread horizontally by either the oral-fecal route or by the respiratory route. Viral shedding may occur for several months after initial infection. The virus has not been shown to transmit from animals to humans.

== Virology ==
=== Structure and genome ===
In common with other picornaviruses, the capsid of BEV is composed of 60 copies of each of four structural proteins, VP1, VP2, VP3 and VP4, in icosahedral symmetry, at about 27 nm in diameter, and enclosing a single stranded positive sense RNA genome of about 7,500 bases. The capsid is not enveloped and roughly spherical with an outer radius of 159 Ångströms and an inner radius of 107 Å. The outer surface of BEV is smoother than the closely related poliovirus due to the truncation of surface protein loops in BEV. It is also smoother than the related human rhinovirus due to the extension of a surface loop in BEV. The three antigenic sites of BEV all occur on a surface ridge at the junction between VP1, VP2, and VP3. BEV has a crater-like depression at the icosahedral 5-fold axis which descends into a cylindrical hole of 10 Å in diameter which runs almost to the inner surface of the capsid. A hydrophobic pocket contained within VP1 contains a myristic acid molecule, the removal of which appears to be a prerequisite for virus uncoating.

=== Replication ===
To replicate, BEV must attach to the host cell surface receptor, penetrate into the cell cytoplasm, and the genome must be uncoated. The host cell surface receptor for BEV has yet to be identified, but is sensitive to neuraminidase.

=== Genetic variability ===
BEVs were originally classified into seven serotypes, but are now accepted as falling into two serotypes, 1 and 2, which are further classified into subtypes. BEV strain VG-5-27 of serotype 1, subtype 1, is the most extensively studied. The tissue tropism of serotype 1 is extremely broad, including human, sheep, horse, dog, camel, and other mammalian hosts. BEV-like sequences have even been reported in shellfish from water contaminated with bovine faeces. Serotype 2 viruses are only found in domestic cattle.

== Signs and symptoms ==
Most cattle show no clinical signs when infected with the virus. However abortion, stillbirth, infertility, and neonatal mortality can occur following infection of the reproductive tract. Enteric signs include diarrhea and weight loss, and respiratory infection can produce a mucoid nasal discharge.

=== Diagnosis ===
As clinical signs are fairly nonspecific and bovine enterovirus is ubiquitous in cattle populations, other causes of disease must be ruled out before diagnosing enterovirus as the cause of disease. Electron microscopy, PCR, complement fixation, antibody fluorescence, neutralization test, and haemagglutination can be used to identify the virus in tissues or secretions.

=== Treatment and control ===
Treatment is symptomatic. Appropriate isolation and hygiene measures should be employed to minimise the spread of disease during an outbreak.

== Research ==
The virus has been investigated for its antitumor capabilities, as it is capable of replicating within breast cancer cell lines and producing a cytopathic effect in human monocytes.
