= Superinfection =

Second infection on top of a previous one

- Specialty: Infectious diseases

A superinfection is a second infection superimposed on an earlier one, especially by a different microbial agent of exogenous or endogenous origin, that is resistant to the treatment being used against the first infection. Examples of this in bacteriology are the overgrowth of endogenous Clostridioides difficile that occurs following treatment with a broad-spectrum antibiotic, and pneumonia or sepsis from Pseudomonas aeruginosa in some immunocompromised patients.

In virology, the definition is slightly different. Superinfection is the process by which a cell that has previously been infected by one virus gets co-infected with a different strain of the virus, or another virus, at a later point in time. In some cases viral superinfections may be resistant to the antiviral drug or drugs that were being used to treat the original infection. Viral superinfections may also be less susceptible to the host's immune response. In Zika virus infection, there is some evidence that primary infection of another Flavivirus, Binjari virus, results in the direct inhibition of a secondary infection of Zika virus in mosquito cells. Recent metagenomic analyses have demonstrated that the novel coronavirus, SARS-CoV-2 can be associated with superinfection and colonization of other pathogens, such as rhinovirus species and Moraxella spp.

== See also ==
- Antibiotic resistance
- Opportunistic infection
- Coinfection
- HIV superinfection
- Viral interference
