= This Week in Virology =

Science podcast

- Genre: Science, Virology
- Format: Audio; Video
- Language: English

Creative team
- Created by: Vincent Racaniello

Cast and voices
- Hosted by: Vincent Racaniello (2008—present) with co-hosts: Dickson Despommier (2008—2024); Alan Dove (2008—present); Rich Condit (2009—present); Kathy Spindler (2012—present); Brianne Barker (2018—present); Angela Mingarelli (2022—present); Jolene Ramsey (2023—present)

Production
- Length: 40 minutes – 2.5 hours

Technical specifications
- Video format: YouTube
- Audio format: MP3

Publication
- No. of episodes: 1013 (as of 4 June 2023) plus 24 special episodes
- Original release: September 24, 2008
- Provider: microbe.tv

Related
- Website: www.microbe.tv/twiv/

This Week in Virology (abbreviated as TWiV; /ˈtwɪv/) is a science podcast founded and hosted by Vincent Racaniello with co-hosts Brianne Barker, Rich Condit, Dickson Despommier, Alan Dove, and Kathy Spindler. The podcast, which began in 2008, covers all things viruses ("the kind that make you sick!") and gained a significant audience during the COVID-19 pandemic. Originally available in audio form only, the show added a video-conference stream in 2020. In addition to regular panelists, there are frequent segments featuring front-line researchers, including director of the NIAID, Anthony Fauci. It is one of several podcasts at microbe.tv that are hosted by Vincent Racaniello.

== Evolving coverage ==
This Week in Virology grew its audience significantly during the COVID-19 pandemic, and although its title remained the same, in early 2020, the frequency of podcasts increased to two or three per week in order to cover breaking news about the dynamic state of research and treatment of the disease.

A physician specializing in infectious diseases, Daniel O. Griffin, who is located in the New York metropolitan area, became a reoccurring guest to give clinical updates on Coronavirus disease 2019. Since December 2020, Griffin's clinical updates are given separate episode numbers and featured as standalone elements that may be accessed individually. Depending upon current events, his clinical updates vary from a half hour to an hour and may cover other pandemics.

Due to the Trump Administration's conflicting statements about the nature and severity of the COVID-19 pandemic, during that time the podcast received criticism from some quarters for getting "too involved in politics", to which the panelists replied that they would not get involved in politics if politics would not get involved in the science.

From TWiV 962 (11 December 2022), Angela Mingarelli, who had made her debut in TWiV 946, joined the podcast as a co-host. TWiV 962 also featured a guest appearance by Angela's sister, astrophysicist Chiara Mingarelli.

In 2023, Jolene Ramsey was added as a host. She is a bacteriophage researcher.
