= 2014 enterovirus D68 outbreak =

Disease outbreak in the United States

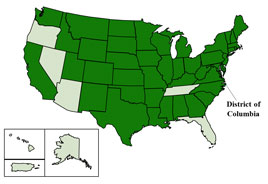
States with lab-confirmed cases of enterovirus D68

In August 2014, enterovirus D68 caused clusters of respiratory disease in the United States. Cases of EV-D68 have occurred in the U.S. for decades, having first been detected in California in 1962. According to the Division of Viral Diseases at the National Center for Immunization and Respiratory Diseases EV-D68 "is one of the most rarely reported serotypes, with only 26 reports throughout the 36-year study period (1970 through 2006)."

== History ==
The outbreak began in 11, mostly Midwestern, states and was first confirmed in Kansas City, Missouri, and Chicago. In Canada in September 2014, 49 cases of the virus were confirmed in Alberta, three in British Columbia, and over 100 in Ontario. Health officials reported Los Angeles County's first case of viral infection on October 1, 2014. By October 2, six more cases had been reported in California: four in San Diego County, and one each in Ventura and Alameda counties.

The CDC later reported that from mid-August to October 10, 691 people in 46 states and the District of Columbia had come down with a respiratory illness caused by EV-D68. Between August and January, 1,395 cases of illness caused by EV-D68 were confirmed, and in total there were 2,287 confirmed cases and 14 deaths.

== Epidemiology ==
The outbreak is the largest ever reported in North America. Enterovirus infections are not rare; there are millions of isolated infections every year. One possibility is that CDC began looking for the virus only after the outbreak. CDC received specimens for lab testing after the outbreak-related hospitalizations.

The surveillance shows that a number of cases are admitted to the hospital each year. The Midwest has been hit in this outbreak. Previously in the United States, EV-D68 was uncommon. This outbreak represents a growth in the incidence.

== Prevention ==
No vaccine for D68 exists currently. Prevention of the outbreak affecting oneself is possible by regular handwashing and other forms of infection control.
