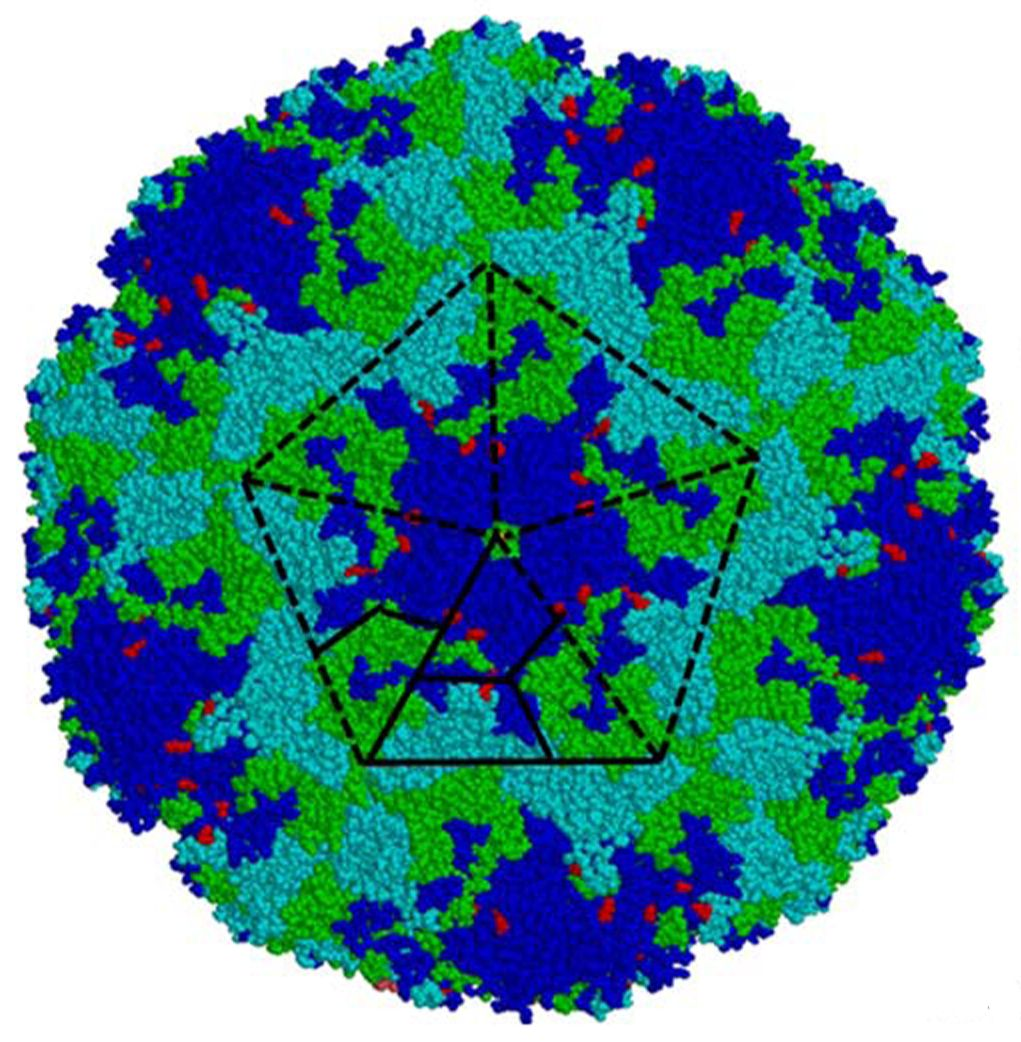
- Enterovirus A71 capsid coloured by chains

Virus classification
- (unranked): Virus
- Realm: Riboviria
- Kingdom: Orthornavirae
- Phylum: Pisuviricota
- Class: Pisoniviricetes
- Order: Picornavirales
- Family: Picornaviridae
- Subfamily: Ensavirinae
- Genus: Enterovirus

Species
- See text

= Enterovirus =

Genus of viruses

Enterovirus (EV) is a genus of positive-sense single-stranded RNA viruses associated with several human and mammalian diseases. Enteroviruses are named by their transmission-route through the intestine ('enteric' meaning intestinal).

Serologic studies have distinguished 71 human enterovirus serotypes on the basis of antibody neutralization tests. Additional antigenic variants have been defined within several of the serotypes on the basis of reduced or nonreciprocal cross-neutralization between variant strains. On the basis of their pathogenesis in humans and animals, the enteroviruses were originally classified into four groups, polioviruses, Coxsackie A viruses (CA), Coxsackie B viruses (CB), and echoviruses, but it was quickly realized that there were significant overlaps in the biological properties of viruses in the different groups. Enteroviruses isolated more recently are named with a system of consecutive numbers: EV-D68, EV-B69, EV-D70, EV-A71, etc., where genotyping is based on the VP1 capsid region.

Enteroviruses affect millions of people worldwide each year and are often found in the respiratory secretions (e.g., saliva, sputum, or nasal mucus) and stool of an infected person. Historically, poliomyelitis was the most significant disease caused by an enterovirus, namely poliovirus. There are 81 non-polio and 3 polio enteroviruses that can cause disease in humans. Of the 81 non-polio types, there are 22 Coxsackie A viruses, 6 Coxsackie B viruses, 28 echoviruses, and 25 other enteroviruses.

Poliovirus, as well as coxsackie and echovirus, is spread through the fecal–oral route. Infection can result in a wide variety of symptoms, including those of: mild respiratory illness (the common cold), hand, foot and mouth disease, acute hemorrhagic conjunctivitis, aseptic meningitis, myocarditis, severe neonatal sepsis-like disease, acute flaccid paralysis, and the related acute flaccid myelitis.

== Virology ==
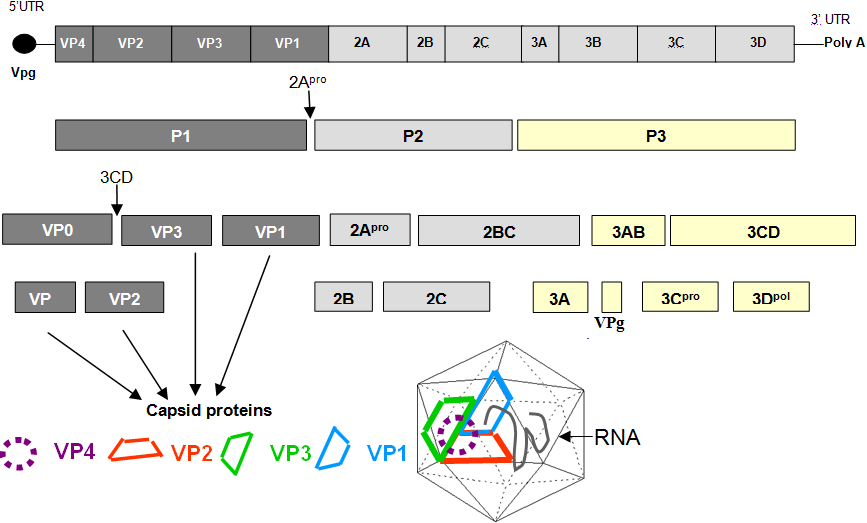
Enterovirus genome, polyprotein processing cascade, and architecture of enterovirus capsid

Enteroviruses are members of the picornavirus family, a large and diverse group of small RNA viruses characterized by a single positive-strand genomic RNA. All enteroviruses contain a genome of approximately 7,500 bases and are known to have a high mutation rate due to low-fidelity replication and frequent recombination. After infection of the host cell, the genome is translated in a cap-independent manner into a single polyprotein, which is subsequently processed by virus-encoded proteases into the structural capsid proteins and the nonstructural proteins, which are mainly involved in the replication of the virus.

RNA recombination appears to be a major driving force in the evolution of enteroviruses as well as in the shaping of their genetic architecture. The mechanism of recombination of the RNA genome likely involves template strand switching during RNA replication, a process known as copy choice recombination. RNA recombination is considered to be an adaptation for dealing with RNA genome damage and a source of genetic diversity. It is also a source of concern for vaccination strategies, because live attenuated/mutated strains used for vaccination could potentially recombine with wild-type related strains, as has been the case with circulating vaccine derived polio viruses (cVDPDs). The capsid region and especially VP1 is a recombination coldspot, and this is one of the main reasons to use this region for genotyping. However, the 5'UTR - capsid junction and the beginning of the P2 region have been observed to recombine very frequently, although recombinations do occur in the rest of the genome as well. Interestingly, the enterovirus species EV-A, EV-B, EV-C, EV-D have not been observed so far to exchange genomic regions among them, with the exception of the 5'UTR.

== Member viruses ==
=== Enterovirus A–L ===
Enteroviruses are a group of ubiquitous viruses that cause a number of infections which are usually mild. The genus enterovirus includes enteroviruses and rhinoviruses. Enterovirus A include coxsackievirus A2, A3, A4, A5, A6, A7, A8, A10, A12, A14, A16 and enterovirus A71, A76, A89, A90, A91, A92, A144, A119, A120, A121, A122 (simian virus 19), A123 (simian virus 43), A124 (simian virus 46), A125 (baboon enterovirus A13). Some viruses initially reported as novel have been found to be misidentified. Thus, coxsackievirus A23 is the same serotype as echovirus 9, and coxsackievirus A15 is the same serotype as coxsackievirus A11 and coxsackievirus A18 is the same serotype as coxsackievirus A13.

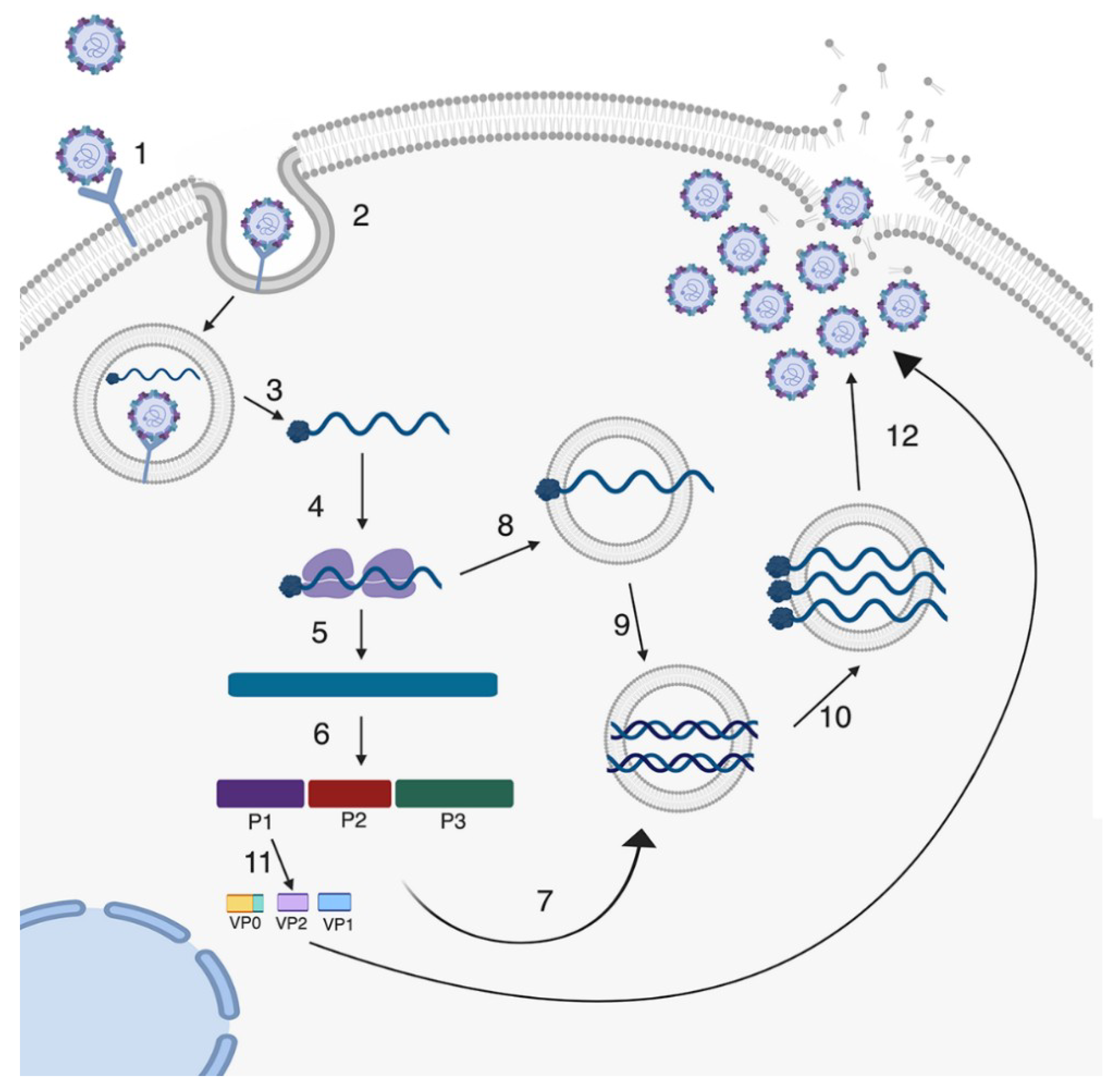
Life cycle of an enterovirus

Coxsackie A16 virus causes human hand, foot and mouth disease.

Enterovirus B includes coxsackievirus B1,2,3,4,5,6; coxsackievirus A9; echovirus 1–33 and enterovirus B69–113. Coxsackie B viruses are found worldwide and can cause myocarditis (inflammation of the heart); pericarditis (inflammation of the sac surrounding the heart); meningitis (inflammation of the membranes that line the brain and spinal cord); and pancreatitis (inflammation of the pancreas). The Coxsackie B viruses are also reported to cause a spastic paralysis due to the degeneration of neuronal tissue and muscle injury. Infections usually occur during warm summer months with symptoms including exanthema, pleurodynia, flu-like illness consisting of fever, fatigue, malaise, myalgia, nausea, abdominal pain and vomiting. Echoviruses are a cause of many of the nonspecific viral infections that can range from minor illness to severe, potentially fatal conditions such as aseptic meningitis, encephalitis, paralysis and myocarditis. It is mainly found in the intestine, and can cause nervous disorders. Type B enteroviruses are responsible for a vast number of mild and acute infections. They have been reported to remain in the body causing persistent infections contributing to chronic diseases such as type I diabetes.

Enterovirus C consists of polioviruses 1,2 and 3; coxsackieviruses A1, A11, A13, A18, A17, 20, A21, A22, A24 and enterovirus C95, C96, C99, C102, C104, C105, C109, C113, C118. The three serotypes of poliovirus, PV-1, PV-2, and PV-3 each have a slightly different capsid protein. Capsid proteins define cellular receptor specificity and virus antigenicity. PV-1 is the most common type to cause infection in humans; however, all three forms are extremely contagious spreading through person-to-person contact. Poliovirus causes Polio, or Poliomyelitis, which is a disabling and life-threatening disease that causes paresthesia, meningitis and permanent paralysis. Symptoms can include sore throat, fever, tiredness, nausea, headache and stomach pain although 72% of those that get infected will not display visible symptoms. There are two types of vaccines available to prevent polio: inactivated poliovirus vaccine given as an injection in the leg (IPV) or arm and oral poliovirus vaccine (OPV). The polio vaccine is highly efficacious giving protection to 99 out of 100 children vaccinated.

=== Persistent non-cytolytic enterovirus ===
Enteroviruses are capable of producing acute infections that are rapidly cleared by the adaptive immune response. However, genomic mutations which enterovirus B serotypes (such as coxsackievirus B and echovirus) may acquire in the host during the acute phase of the infection can transform these viruses into the non-cytolytic form (also known as non-cytopathic or defective enterovirus), a form which is capable of causing persistent low-level infections in human tissues that can last indefinitely.

This persistent non-cytolytic enterovirus is a mutated quasispecies, and such non-cytolytic infections have been found in the pancreas in type 1 diabetes, in chronic myocarditis and dilated cardiomyopathy, in valvular heart disease, in the muscles, intestines and brain in myalgic encephalomyelitis, and in Sjögren's syndrome. In these persistent infections, enteroviral RNA is present at low levels in the tissues (both as single-stranded viral RNA, and in the more immune resistant doubled-stranded RNA form). Some researchers believe this enteroviral RNA is just a remnant of the acute infection, although other scientists believe these persistent intracellular viral RNA infections may have pathological effects, playing a causal role their associated diseases.

=== Enterovirus D68 ===
EV-D68 first was identified in California in 1962. Compared with other enteroviruses, it has been rarely reported in the U.S. in the past 40 years. Most people who get infected are infants, children, and teens. EV-D68 usually causes mild to severe respiratory illness; however, the full spectrum of EV-D68 illness is not well-defined. Most start with common cold symptoms of runny nose and cough. Some, but not all, may also have fever. For more severe cases, difficulty breathing, wheezing or problems catching your breath may occur. As of October 4, 2014, there has been one death in New Jersey directly linked to EV-D68, as well as one death in Rhode Island attributed to a combination of EV-D68 and sepsis caused by an infection of Staphylococcus aureus.

=== Enterovirus A71 ===
Enterovirus A71 (EV-A71) is notable as one of the major causative agents for hand, foot and mouth disease (HFMD), and is sometimes associated with severe central nervous system diseases. EV-A71 was first isolated and characterized from cases of neurological disease in California in 1969. To date, little is known about the molecular mechanisms of host response to EV-A71 infection, but increases in the level of mRNAs encoding chemokines, proteins involved in protein degradation, complement proteins, and proapoptotic proteins have been implicated.

=== Poliovirus ===
There are three serotypes of poliovirus, PV-1, PV-2, and PV-3; each with a slightly different capsid protein. Capsid proteins define cellular receptor specificity and virus antigenicity. PV-1 is the most common form encountered in nature; however, all three forms are extremely infectious. Poliovirus can affect the spinal cord and cause poliomyelitis.

Polioviruses were formerly classified as a species belonging to the genus Enterovirus in the family Picornaviridae. The Poliovirus species has been eliminated from the genus Enterovirus. The following serotypes, Human poliovirus 1, Human poliovirus 2, and Human poliovirus 3, were assigned to the species Human enterovirus C, in the genus Enterovirus in the family Picornaviridae. The type species of the genus Enterovirus was changed from Poliovirus to Human enterovirus C. This has been ratified in April 2008. The 39th Executive Committee (EC39) of the International Committee on Taxonomy of Viruses (ICTV) met in Canada during June 2007 with new taxonomic proposals.

Two of the proposals with three changes were:

- Code 2005.261V.04: To remove the following species Poliovirus from the existing genus Enterovirus in the family Picornaviridae.
- Code 2005.262V.04: To assign the viruses; PV-1, PV-2, PV-3 to the existing species Human enterovirus C in the genus Enterovirus in the family Picornaviridae.
- Code 2005.263V.04: To change the type species Poliovirus from the existing genus Enterovirus in the family Picornaviridae to the type species Human enterovirus C.

Proposals approved at the (EC39) meeting of 2007, were sent to members of ICTV via email for ratification and have become official taxonomy. There have been a total of 215 taxonomic proposals, which have been approved and ratified since the 8th ICTV Report of 2005.

The ratification process was performed by email. The proposals were sent electronically via email on March 18, 2008, to ICTV members with a request to vote on whether to ratify the taxonomic proposals, with a 1-month deadline. The following are two of the taxonomic proposals with three changes that were ratified by ICTV members in April 2008:

Picornaviruses

- 2005.261V.04: To remove the following species from the existing genus Enterovirus in the family Picornaviridae: Poliovirus. (Note: Poliovirus hereby loses its status as a virus species.)
- 2005.262V.04: To assign the following viruses to the species Human enterovirus C in the existing genus Enterovirus in the family Picornaviridae: Human poliovirus 1, Human poliovirus 2, Human poliovirus 3. (This is not strictly necessary as a taxonomic proposal because it concerns entities below the species level, but it is left in to clarify this reorganization of the Picornaviridae.)
- 2005.263V.04: To change the type species of the genus Enterovirus in the family Picornaviridae, from Poliovirus to Human enterovirus C.

== Diseases caused by enterovirus infection ==
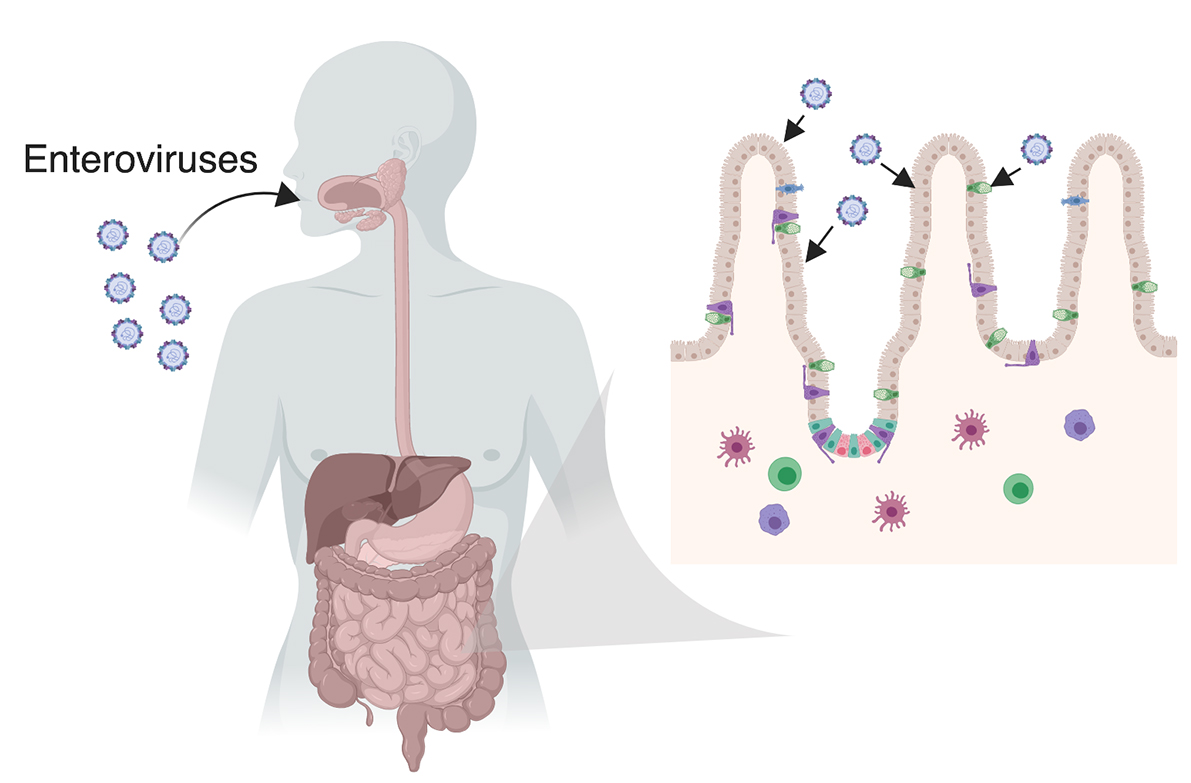
Enteroviruses generally infect by the fecal–oral route and target the gastrointestinal epithelium early during their life cycle. They can also infect by the respiratory tract as in the case of enterovirus D68 and rhinoviruses.

Enteroviruses cause a wide range of symptoms, and while their long list of signs and symptoms should put them on the differential diagnosis list of many illnesses, they often go unnoticed. Enteroviruses can cause anything from rashes in small children, to summer colds, to encephalitis, to blurred vision, to pericarditis. Enteroviral infections have a great range in presentation and seriousness. Non polio enteroviruses cause 10–15 million infections and tens of thousands of hospitalizations in the US each year. Enteroviruses can be identified through cell culture or PCR assay, collected from fecal or respiratory specimens. Below are common enterovirus related diseases, including poliomyelitis.

- Poliomyelitis primarily via the fecal-oral route
- Polio-like syndrome found in children who tested positive for enterovirus 68.
- Nonspecific febrile illness is the most common presentation of enterovirus infection. Other than fever, symptoms include muscle pain, sore throat, gastrointestinal distress/abdominal discomfort, and headache. In newborns the picture may be that of sepsis, however, and can be severe and life-threatening.
- Enteroviruses are by far the most common causes of aseptic meningitis in children. In the United States, enteroviruses are responsible for 30,000 to 50,000 meningitis hospitalizations per year as a result of 10–15 million infections.
- Bornholm disease or epidemic pleurodynia is characterized by severe paroxysmal pain in the chest and abdomen, along with fever, and sometimes nausea, headache, and emesis.
- Pericarditis and/or myocarditis are typically caused by enteroviruses; symptoms consist of fever with dyspnea and chest pain. Arrhythmias, heart failure, and myocardial infarction have also been reported.
- Acute hemorrhagic conjunctivitis can be caused by enteroviruses.
- Herpangina is caused by Coxsackie A virus, and causes a vesicular rash in the oral cavity and on the pharynx, along with high fever, sore throat, malaise, and often dysphagia, loss of appetite, back pain, and headache. It is also self-limiting, with symptoms typically ending in 3–4 days.
- Hand, foot and mouth disease is a childhood illness most commonly caused by infection by Coxsackie A virus or EV71.
- Encephalitis is rare manifestation of enterovirus infection; when it occurs, the most frequent enterovirus found to be causing it is echovirus 9.
- Myocarditis is characterized by inflammation of the myocardium (cardiac muscle cells). Over the last couple of decades, numerous culprits have been identified as playing a role in myocarditis pathogenesis in addition to the enterovirus, which at first was the most commonly implicated virus in this pathology. One of the most common enteroviruses found to be responsible for causing Myocarditis is the Coxsackie B3 virus.
- A 2007 study suggested that acute respiratory or gastrointestinal infections associated with enterovirus may be a factor in myalgic encephalomyelitis.

=== Suspected diseases ===
Encephalitis lethargica, the 1917–1926 "sleeping sickness".

=== Possible correlations being studied ===
Enterovirus has been speculated to be connected with Type 1 diabetes. It has been proposed that type 1 diabetes is a virus-triggered autoimmune response in which the immune system attacks virus-infected cells along with the insulin-producing beta cells in the pancreas. A team working at University of Tampere, Finland identified the enterovirus Coxsackievirus B1 as possibly linked to type 1 diabetes (which is an autoimmune disease).

Enteroviruses, including polioviruses, may be a cause of myalgic encephalomyelitis/chronic fatigue syndrome (ME/CFS).

== Symptoms ==
Most people who contract enterovirus have mild symptoms lasting about a week. Those with higher risk may have more complications, sometimes becoming fatal. The most common sign of enterovirus is a common cold. More intense symptoms of enterovirus include hypoxia, aseptic meningitis, conjunctivitis, hand, foot and mouth disease, and paralysis.

== Treatment ==
Treatment for enteroviral infection is mainly supportive. In cases of pleurodynia, treatment consists of analgesics to relieve the severe pain that occurs in patients with the disease; in some severe cases, opiates may be needed. Treatment for aseptic meningitis caused by enteroviruses is also mainly symptomatic. In patients with enteroviral carditis, treatment consists of the prevention and treatment of complications such as arrhythmias, pericardial effusion, and cardiac failure. Other treatments that have been investigated for enteroviral carditis include intravenous immunoglobulin.

== Taxonomy ==
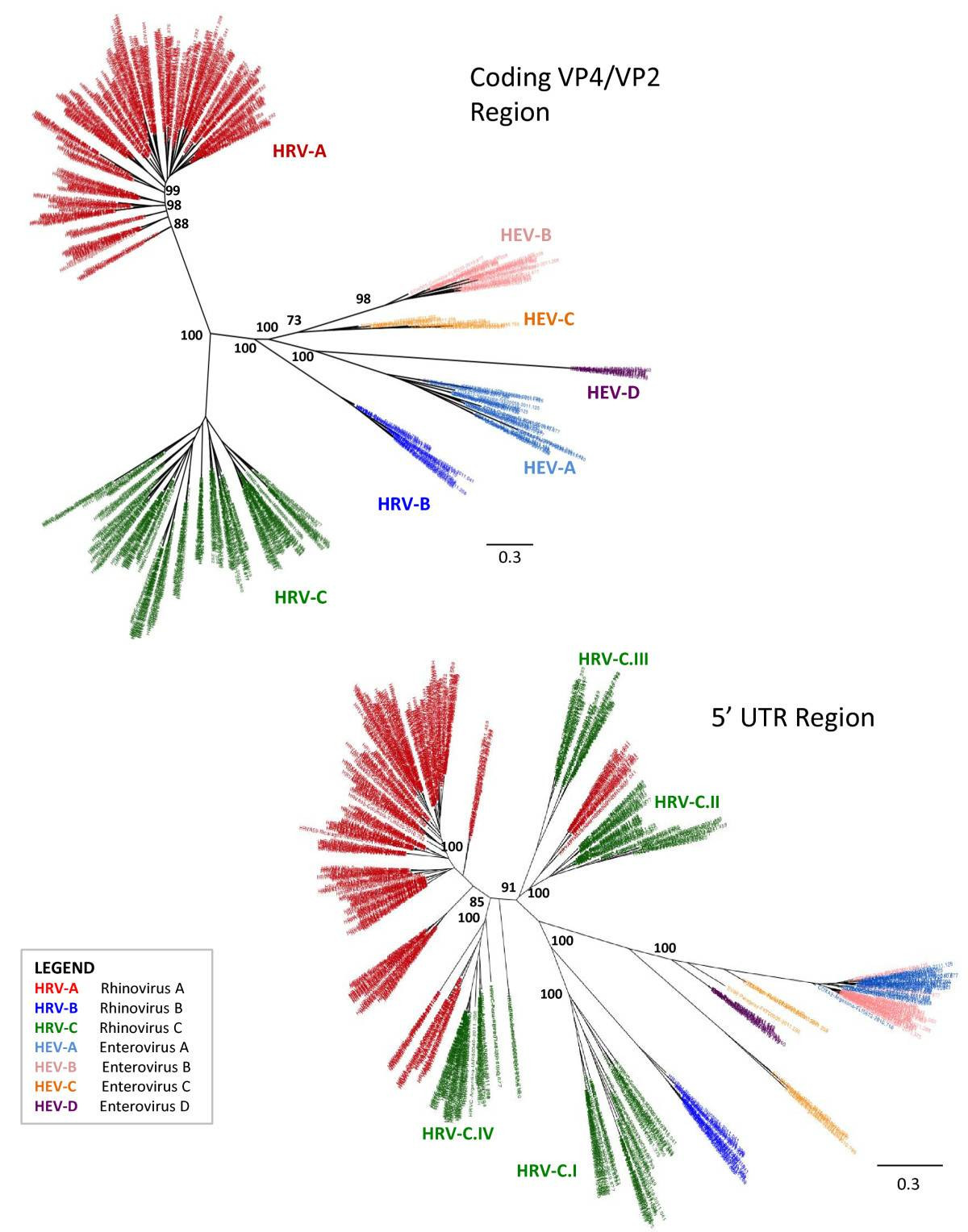
Maximum likelihood phylogenetic trees of enterovirus species A, B, C, D and rhinovirus A, B, C isolates from Latin America. The 5'UTR region is much more affected by recombination events than the VP4/VP2 coding sequence.

The enterovirus genus includes the following fifteen species:

- Enterovirus A (formerly Human enterovirus A)
- Enterovirus B (formerly Human enterovirus B)
- Enterovirus C (formerly Human enterovirus C)
- Enterovirus D (formerly Human enterovirus D)
- Enterovirus E (formerly Bovine enterovirus group A)
- Enterovirus F (formerly Bovine enterovirus group B)
- Enterovirus G (formerly Porcine enterovirus B)
- Enterovirus H (formerly Simian enterovirus A)
- Enterovirus I
- Enterovirus J
- Enterovirus K
- Enterovirus L
- Rhinovirus A (formerly Human rhinovirus A)
- Rhinovirus B (formerly Human rhinovirus B)
- Rhinovirus C (formerly Human rhinovirus C)

These fifteen species' serotype include:

- Coxsackievirus
  - Enterovirus A: serotypes CVA-2, CVA-3, CVA-4, CVA-5, CVA-6, CVA-7, CVA-8, CVA-10, CVA-12, CVA-14, and CVA-16.
  - Enterovirus B: serotypes CVB-1, CVB-2, CVB-3, CVB-4, CVB-5, CVB-6, and CVA-9.
  - Enterovirus C: serotypes CVA-1, CVA-11, CVA-13, CVA-17, CVA-19, CVA-20, CVA-21, CVA-22, and CVA-24.
- Echovirus
  - Enterovirus B: serotypes E-1, E-2, E-3, E-4, E-5, E-6, E-7, E-9, E-11 through E-21, E-24, E-25, E-26, E-27, E-29, E-30, E-31, E32, and E-33.
- Enterovirus
  - Enterovirus A: serotypes EV-A71, EV-A76, EV-A89 through EV-A92, EV-A114, EV-A119, EV-A120, EV-A121, SV19, SV43, SV46, and BabEV-A13.
  - Enterovirus B: serotypes EV-B69, EV-B73 through EV-B75, EV-B77 through EV-B88, EV-B93, EV-B97, EV-B98, EV-B100, EV-B101, EV-B106, EV-B107, EV-B110 through EV-B113, and SA5.
  - Enterovirus C: serotypes EV-C95, EV-C96, EV-C99, EV-C102, EV-C104, EV-C105, EV-C109, EV-C113, EV-C116, EV-C117, and EV-C118.
  - Enterovirus D: serotypes EV-D68, EV-D70, EV-D94, EV-D111, and EV-D120.
  - Enterovirus E: serotypes EV-E1, EV-E2, EV-E3, EV-E4, and EV-E5.
  - Enterovirus F: serotypes EV-F1, EV-F2, EV-F3, EV-F4, EV-F5, EV-F6, and EV-F7.
  - Enterovirus G: serotypes EV-G1 through EV-G20.
  - Enterovirus H: serotype EV-H.
  - Enterovirus I: serotype EV-I1 and EV-I2.
  - Enterovirus J: serotypes: EV-J1, EV-J103, and EV-J108.
  - Enterovirus K: serotype EV-K1 and EV-K2.
  - Enterovirus L: serotype EV-L1.
- Rhinovirus
  - Rhinovirus A: serotypes RV-A1, RV-A1B, RV-A2, RV-A7 through RV-A13, RV-A15, RV-A16, RV-A18 through RV-A25, RV-A28 through RV-A34, RV-A36, RV-A38 through RV-A41, RV-A43, RV-A45 through RV-A47, RV-A49 through RV-A51, RV-A53 through RV-A68, RV-A71, RV-A73 through RV-A78, RV-A80 through RV-A82, RV-A85, RV-A88 through RV-A90, RV-A94, RV-A96, and RV-A100 through RV-A108
  - Rhinovirus B: serotypes RV-B3 through RV-B6, RV-B14, RV-B17, RV-B26, RV-B27, RV-B35, RV-B37, RV-B42, RV-B48, RV-B52, RV-B69, RV-B70, RV-B72, RV-B79, RV-B83, RV-B84, RV-B86, RV-B91 through RV-B93, RV-B97, and RV-B99 through RV-B104
  - Rhinovirus C: serotypes RV-C1 through RV-C51, RV-C54, RV-C55, and RV-C56.
- Poliovirus
  - Enterovirus C: serotypes PV-1, PV-2, and PV-3.

== See also ==
- Coxsackievirus
- Echovirus
- Hand, foot, and mouth disease
- Influenza
- Influenza-like illness
