= Daniel O. Griffin =

American infectious disease specialist

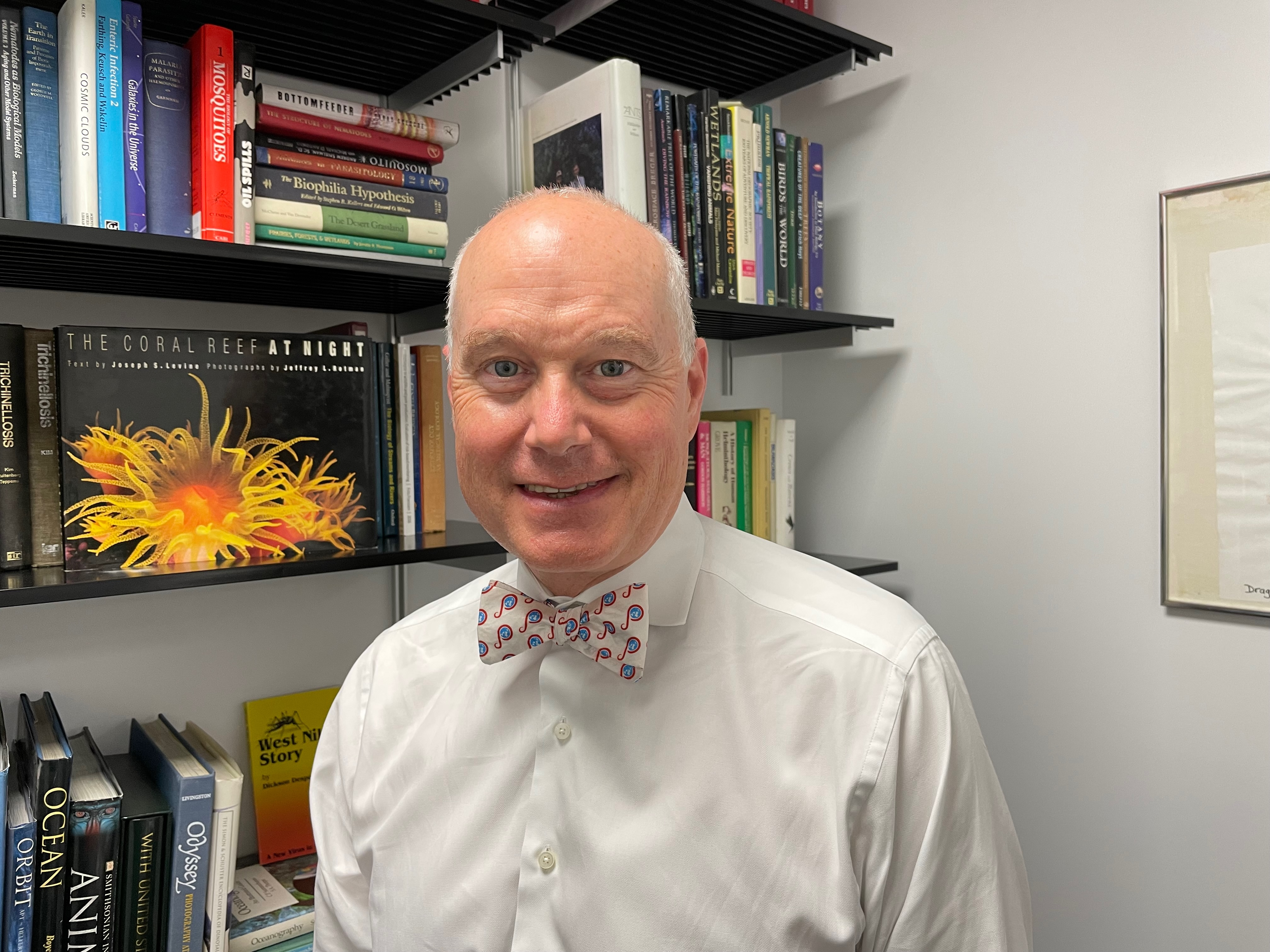

Daniel O'Connell Griffin (born 15 July 1967) is an American physician-scientist and infectious disease specialist. He is president of the nonprofit organization Parasites Without Borders, Chief of the Division of Infectious Disease at Island Infectious Disease Medical, and former Chief of Infectious Disease at Optum Tri-State.

Griffin is also an instructor of clinical medicine at Columbia University Irving Medical Center and a former associate research scientist in its Department of Biochemistry and Molecular Biophysics. He is board-certified in Internal Medicine and Infectious Disease, and holds certification in Travel Medicine (CTH) and Clinical Tropical Medicine (CTropMed).

== Education ==
Griffin earned his BA in Philosophy from the University of Colorado Boulder in 1989. He received his MD degree from New York University School of Medicine and completed an internal medicine residency at the University of Utah. He completed a PhD in Molecular medicine from the Elmezzi Graduate School of Molecular Medicine, Manhasset, New York in 2012. In 2014, he completed a fellowship in infectious diseases from North Shore-Long Island Jewish Health System-Hofstra University in Manhasset.

He also completed a Certificate in the Business of Medicine at the Johns Hopkins Carey Business School in 2000, and an ASTMH-approved course in Clinical Tropical Medicine and Travel Medicine through the University of Minnesota in 2016.

== Research and career ==
Griffin is a co-director of the life science podcast network Microbe.TV, where he co-hosts several shows, including This Week in Virology (TWiV), This Week in Parasitism, and The Infectious Disease Podcast. His weekly COVID Clinical Update podcast has been cited for its role in translating emerging clinical knowledge during the pandemic.

Griffin co-authored the textbook Parasitic Diseases (7th edition 2019), available in more than 100 countries. In 2017, he published the paper Human B1 cells in umbilical cord and adult peripheral blood express the novel phenotype CD20+CD27+CD43+CD70 in the Journal of Experimental Medicine. He also contributed chapters to major infectious disease texts, including the AAP Red Book (2021, 2024, and 2027 editions) and Elsevier's Textbook of SARS-CoV-2 and COVID-19 (2023).

He is senior fellow in infectious disease at United Health Group, Instructor in Clinical Medicine, Columbia University Irving Medical Centre, and Infectious Disease Clinician Chief, Pro Health Care.

Griffin's work includes investigating the potential role of human B1 cells and natural antibodies in the development of HIV-associated malignancies. He has a special focus on HIV and tropical medicine. His research interests are broad and include studies on infectious disease and immunology, molecular medicine, and tropical medicine. As of 2021, his research focused on HIV-1, stem cell latency, stem cell gene therapy using retroviral vectors, and COVID-19. He has since published extensively on Long COVID, COVID-19 vaccine effectiveness, monoclonal antibody therapies, and public health policy. Notable recent publications have appeared in Nature Communications, BMJ Open, Open Forum Infectious Diseases, and Blood Advances.

Griffin has volunteered with the nonprofit Foundation for International Medical Relief of Children, including conducting mandatory health education sessions for its staff. He joined the biomedical research community of the Vagelos College of Physicians and Surgeons of Columbia University. He is an associate research scientist in Columbia's Department of Biochemistry and Molecular Biophysics, instructor of clinical medicine, and a member of the division of infectious diseases.

== Science communication ==
Griffin co-authored at least two editions of a textbook on parasitology, Parasitic Diseases, with Dickson Despommier. The two men decided to found the nonprofit organization Parasites Without Borders to disseminate clinical information about parasitic disease, including the textbook. As of June 2021, 40,000 copies had been distributed to over 100 countries.

He has co-hosted This Week in Parasitism since episode 80 and joined This Week in Virology in March 2020 to deliver weekly clinical updates on COVID-19. He later became a host of The Infectious Disease Puscast, further expanding his public engagement in infectious disease education.

In early March 2020 as the COVID-19 pandemic began to seriously affect the New York City area, Griffin began providing clinical updates about the virus based on his practice and correspondence with medical colleagues around the world on another podcast hosted by Racaniello, This Week in Virology (TWiV). Eventually the popularity of the clinical updates resulted in Racaniello publishing them in standalone episodes of TWiV. As of May 2022, Griffin had provided 112 such clinical updates on TWiV.

In 2024, he gave keynote addresses for the Maine Medical Association and the Taiwanese Medical Association, and spoke at the Asia Pacific Regional Conference of WONCA in Singapore.

== Affiliations ==
Griffin is a member in the following scientific societies or associations:

- American Society for Microbiology (ASM)
- American Medical Association (AMA) – Lifetime member
- American Association for the Advancement of Science (AAAS)
- Infectious Diseases Society of America (IDSA)
- American Society of Tropical Medicine and Hygiene (ASTMH)
- International Society for Travel Medicine (ISTM)
- Wilderness Medical Society – Lifetime member
- American Society of Parasitologists (ASP)

== Patents ==
Griffin is co-inventor on the patent "Human B1 cells and uses thereof," issued in 2013.

== Awards ==
- Ruth and Leonard Litwin Fellowship Award in 2011
- Davies Award in 2006 (An international award given by HIMSS, the largest health IT organization in the world)
- Optum Sages of Clinical Services Award (2023)
- Lawrence Scherr Awards for Scholarly Activity (2013, 2014)
- Malcolm Baldridge National Quality Award (2008) while Chair of Medicine at Poudre Valley Hospital
- DOQ-IT Best Practice Award (2005) from CMS for top national clinical outcomes

== Selected publications ==
- "Impact of COVID-19 vaccination on symptoms and immune phenotypes in vaccine-naïve individuals with Long COVID" in Nature Communications (2025)
- "Post-Acute Sequelae of COVID (PASC or Long COVID): An Evidence-Based Approach," Open Forum Infectious Diseases (2024)
- "Does Monoclonal Antibody Treatment for COVID-19 Impact Short and Long-term Outcomes?" BMJ Open (2023)
- Human B1 cells in umbilical cord and adult peripheral blood express the novel phenotype CD20^{+}CD27^{+}CD43^{+}CD70^{−}
- Contributions to American Society of Hematology living guidelines on the use of anticoagulation in COVID-19 (2021–2025)
- Human B-1 cells take the stage
- A small CD11b^{+} human B1 cell subpopulation stimulates T cells and is expanded in lupus.
- Human "orchestrator" CD11b+ B1 cells spontaneously secrete interleukin-10 and regulate T-cell activity.
- Human B1 cell frequency: isolation and analysis of human B1 cells
- Human B1 cells are CD3^{−}: A reply to "A human equivalent of mouse B-1 cells?" and "The nature of circulating CD27^{+}CD43^{+} B cells"
