= Polio-like syndrome =

Group of medical symptoms that resemble poliomyelitis

Polio-like syndrome is a general description of a group of symptoms which mimic polio, including rarely permanent paralysis. Various triggers have been found, including some viruses from the same virus group as polio: enterovirus 68, enterovirus 71, and coxsackievirus A7. These are suspected in many cases of acute flaccid myelitis. Other non-virus causes of polio-like symptoms are observed, though rarely, from snake bite, spider bite, scorpion sting, tick bite, or chemicals such as arsenic and organophosphorus insecticides.
