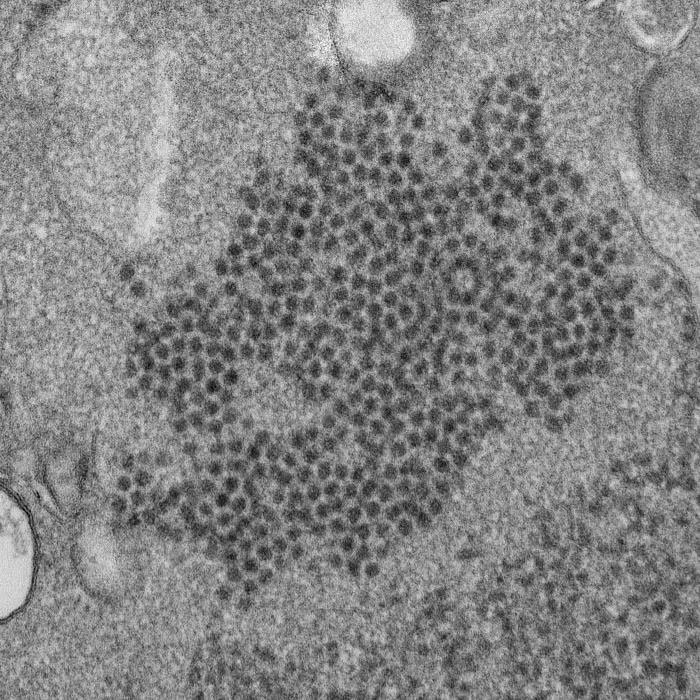
- Enterovirus D68 particles

Virus classification
- (unranked): Virus
- Realm: Riboviria
- Kingdom: Orthornavirae
- Phylum: Pisuviricota
- Class: Pisoniviricetes
- Order: Picornavirales
- Family: Picornaviridae
- Genus: Enterovirus
- Species: Enterovirus D

Subtypes
- Enterovirus 68, Enterovirus 70, Enterovirus 94, Enterovirus 111, Enterovirus 120

= Enterovirus D =

Species of virus

Enterovirus D is a species of enterovirus which causes disease in humans. Five subtypes have been identified to date:

- Enterovirus 68: causes respiratory disease, and is associated with acute flaccid paralysis (AFP) – a disease similar to polio.
- Enterovirus 70: causes outbreaks of acute hemorrhagic conjunctivitis.
- Enterovirus 94: has been associated with a single case of AFP.
- Enterovirus 111: has been associated with a single case of AFP, and has been found in primate feces.
- Enterovirus 120: has only been found in non-human primate feces.

== Similarities with Rhinovirus ==
Enterovirus D has many serotypes and some closely resembling other viral species, such as Human rhinovirus (HRV) 87, which was reclassified as a strain of EV-D68 (Enterovirus D - Serotype 68)
