= Dickson Despommier =

American academic, microbiologist and ecologist (1940–2025)

Dickson D. Despommier
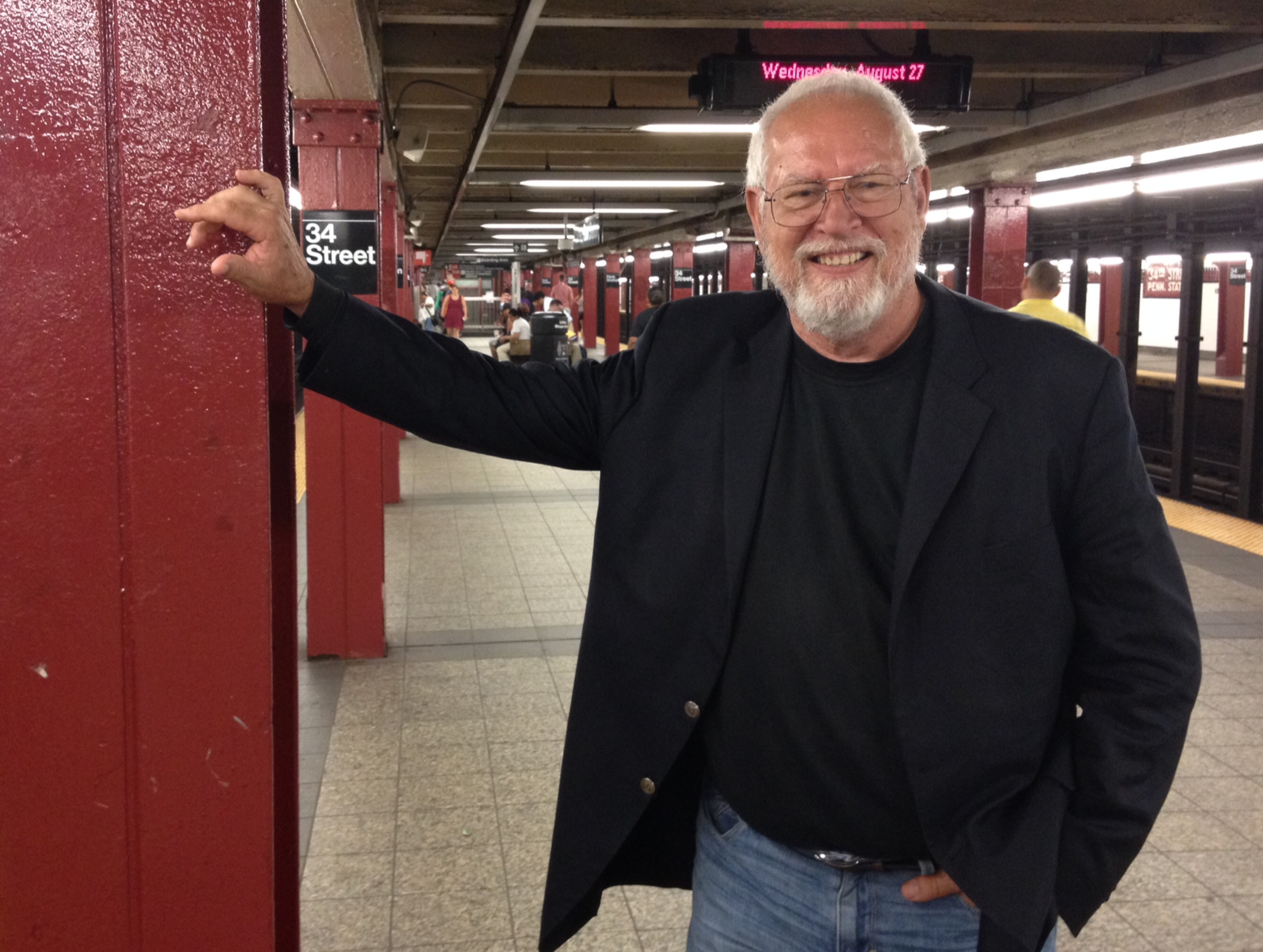
- Despommier in 2014
- Born: Dickson Donald Despommier; June 5, 1940; New Orleans, Louisiana, U.S.
- Died: February 7, 2025 (aged 84); New York City, New York, U.S.
- Citizenship: American
- Education: Fairleigh Dickinson University (BS), Biology; Columbia University (MS), Medical Parasitology; University of Notre Dame (PhD), Microbiology
- Known for: Vertical Farming; Medical Ecology of West Nile Virus; Urban Sustainable Agricultural Initiatives; Emerging Infectious Disease Ecology; The Trichinella Page; Medical Ecology; The Vertical Farm; This Week in Virology
- Awards: American Medical Student Association National Teaching Award 2003
- Scientific career
- Fields: Parasitology; Ecology
- Workplaces: Columbia University Department of Environmental Health Sciences, School of Public Health and Department of Microbiology, Graduate School of Arts and Sciences
- Thesis: The in vivo and in vitro analysis of acquired resistance to Trichinella spiralis infections in mice. (1967)

Dickson Donald Despommier (June 5, 1940 – February 7, 2025) was an American academic, microbiologist and ecologist who was a professor of microbiology and Public Health at Columbia University. From 1971 to 2009, he conducted research on intracellular parasitism and taught courses on parasitic diseases, medical ecology and ecology. Despommier received media coverage for his ideas on vertical farming.

== Early life and education ==
Despommier was born on June 5, 1940, in New Orleans. His father was a shipping line accountant. When he was a child, his parents divorced.

In 1962, Despommier received a BS in biology from Fairleigh Dickinson University. In 1964, he received an MS in medical parasitology from Columbia University. In 1967, he received a PhD in microbiology from the University of Notre Dame.

== Research ==
Despommier had research interests in the ecotone as a zone of high disease transmission; the spread of schistosomiasis, malaria, and helminths (ascaris, hookworm, trichuris) in agricultural areas; and the ecology of West Nile virus with a focus on related weather patterns.

Despommier was especially known for his research on Trichinella spiralis, which led to numerous advances in understanding of the "muscle stage" of the organism, and how it maintains itself in the host for long periods of time in the Nurse cell/parasite complex (weeks to years in some cases).

He developed his concept of vertical farming over a 10-year period with graduate students in a medical ecology class beginning in 1999, with work continued by designer Chris Jacobs and Ontarian eco-architect Gordon Graff from the University of Waterloo's School of Architecture.

== Science outreach to the public ==
In June 2008, Despommier appeared on The Colbert Report, where he described the concept of vertical farming to Stephen Colbert.

He was a regular panel-member of the podcast This Week in Virology, produced by his colleague Vincent Racaniello.

This Week in Parasitism (TWiP) is a podcast about eukaryotic parasites started by Vincent Racaniello and Dickson Despommier. Daniel Griffin, MD joined the team in January 2015, followed by Christina Naula.

== Death ==
Despommier died on February 7, 2025, at the age of 84.

== Books ==
Despommier authored or co-authored 10 books:

- Despommier, Dickson D. (1967). The in Vivo in Vitro Analysis of Acquired Resistance to Trichinella Spiralis Infections in Mice. University of Notre Dame, April.
- Despommier, Dickson D. (2001). West Nile Story. Apple Trees Productions. ISBN 978-0-9700027-1-6.
- Despommier, Dickson (2010). The Vertical Farm: Feeding the World in the 21st Century. St. Martin's Press. ISBN 978-0-312-61139-2.
- Despommier, Dickson D.; Karapelou, John W. (1987). Parasite Life Cycles. Springer Science & Business Media. ISBN 0-387-96486-X.
- Katz, M.; Despommier, Dickson D.; Gwadz, Robert (1989). Parasitic Diseases 2nd ed. Springer Science & Business Media. ISBN 978-1-4684-0470-8.
- Despommier, Dickson D.; Hotez, Peter; Gwadz, Robert (1994). Parasitic Diseases, 3rd ed. Springer Sciences & Business Media. ISBN 0-387-94223-8.
- Despommier, Dickson D.; Gwadz, Robert; Hotez, Peter; Knirsch, Charles (2000). Parasitic Diseases 4th ed. Apple Trees Productions, LLC. ISBN 097000270X.
- Despommier, Dickson D.; Gwadz, Robert; Hotez, Peter; Knirsch, Charles (2006). Parasitic Diseases 5th ed. Apple Trees Productions, LLC. ISBN 0-9700027-7-7.
- Despommier, Dickson D.; Griffin, Daniel; Gwadz, Robert; Hotez, Peter; Knirsch, Charles (2017). Parasitic Diseases (6th ed.). ISBN 978-0-9978400-0-1.
- Despommier, Dickson D. (2013). People, Parasites, and Plowshares: Learning From Our Body's Most Terrifying Invaders. Columbia University Press. ISBN 978-0-231-53526-7.
- Despommier, Dickson D. (2023). The New City: How to Build Our Sustainable Urban Future. Columbia University Press. ISBN 978-0-231-20550-4.

Chapters by Despommier:

- Despommier, D. (2020). Vertical farming systems for urban agriculture. In: Wiskerke, J. S. C. Achieving sustainable urban agriculture. Cambridge: Burleigh Dodds Science Publishing. ISBN 978-1-78676-316-7
