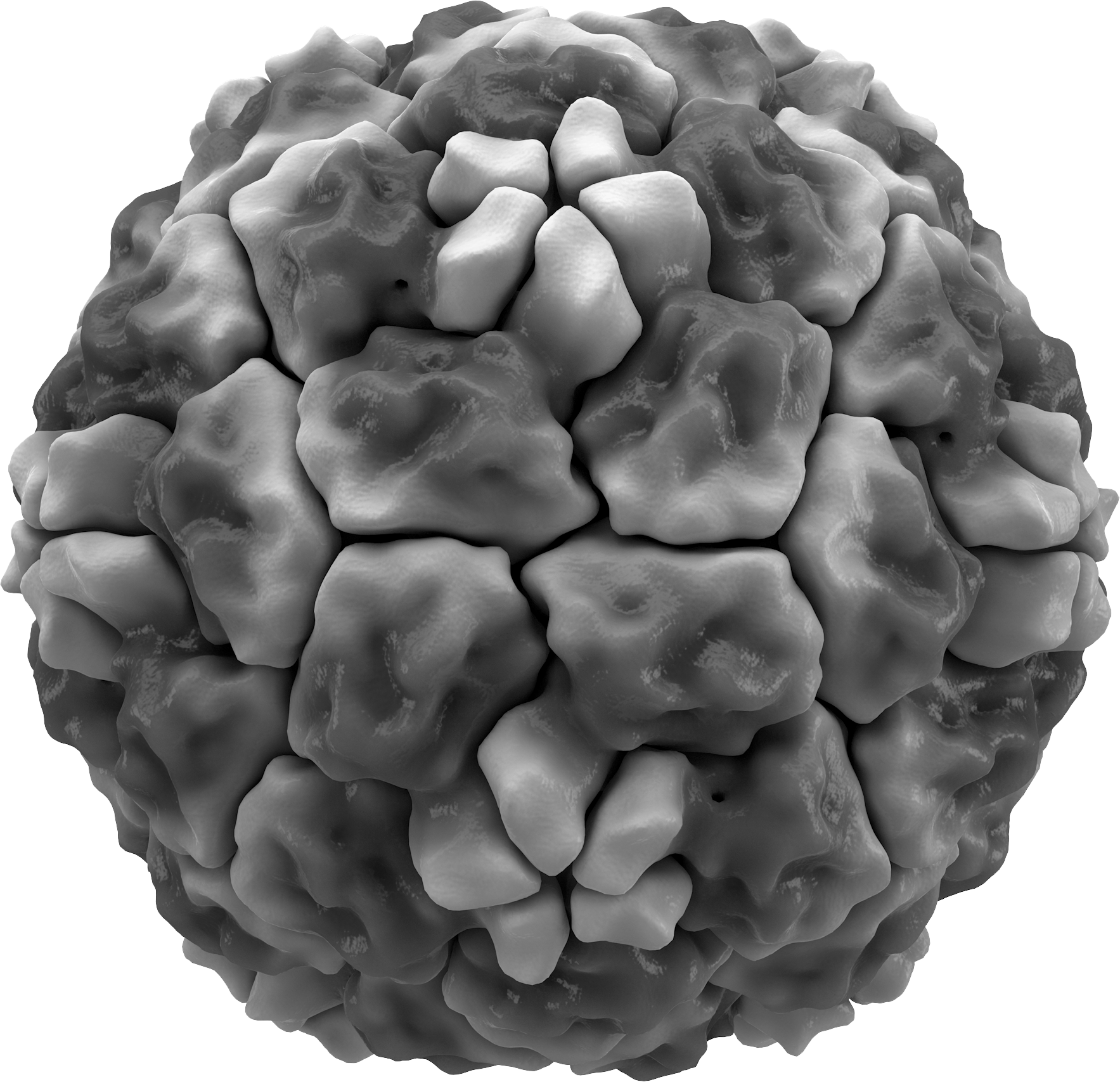
- Isosurface of the capsid of human rhinovirus 14 (HRV-14) which is a serotype of Rhinovirus B, one of the viruses which cause the common cold. Protein spikes are colored white for visual clarity.

Scientific classification
- (unranked): Virus
- Realm: Riboviria
- Kingdom: Orthornavirae
- Phylum: Pisuviricota
- Class: Pisoniviricetes
- Order: Picornavirales
- Family: Picornaviridae
- Subfamily: Ensavirinae
- Genus: Enterovirus

Groups included
- Rhinovirus A; Rhinovirus B; Rhinovirus C

Cladistically included but traditionally excluded taxa
- Enterovirus A; Enterovirus B; Enterovirus C; Enterovirus D; Enterovirus E; Enterovirus F; Enterovirus G; Enterovirus H; Enterovirus I; Enterovirus J; Enterovirus K; Enterovirus L

= Rhinovirus =

Genus of viruses (Enterovirus)

The rhinovirus (from the Ancient Greek: ῥίς, romanized: rhis "nose", gen ῥινός, romanized: rhinos "of the nose", and the Latin: vīrus) is a positive-sense, single-stranded RNA virus belonging to the genus Enterovirus in the family Picornaviridae. Rhinovirus is the most common viral infectious agent in humans and is the predominant cause of the common cold, causing at least 50% of cold infections.

The three species of rhinovirus (A, B, and C) include at least 165 recognized types that differ according to their surface antigens or genetics. They are among the smallest viruses, with diameters of about 30 nanometers. By comparison, other viruses, such as smallpox and vaccinia, are around ten times larger at about 300 nanometers, while influenza viruses are around 80–120 nanometers.

Rhinoviruses are transmitted through aerosols, respiratory droplets, fomites, and direct person-to-person contact. They primarily infect nasal epithelial cells in the airway and cause mild symptoms such as sore throat, cough, and nasal congestion. However, rhinovirus infection can cause more severe disease in infants, the elderly, and the immunocompromised. Rhinoviruses are also recognized as a major cause of asthma exacerbations.

As of September 2025, there were no FDA-approved vaccines or antiviral treatments for rhinovirus infection.

== History ==
In 1953, when a cluster of nurses developed a mild respiratory illness, Winston Price, from Johns Hopkins University, took nasal passage samples and isolated the first rhinovirus, which he called the JH virus, named after Johns Hopkins. His findings were published in 1956.

In 2006, advancements in molecular testing techniques for identifying rhinoviruses in clinical specimens led to the discovery of rhinovirus C species in samples from Queensland, Australia and New York City, United States. The ICTV formally designated RV-C as a separate species in 2009.

== Transmission ==
Rhinoviruses may be spread via airborne aerosols, respiratory droplets and from fomites (contaminated surfaces), including direct person-to-person contact. Rhinoviruses can survive on surfaces such as stainless steel or plastic for several hours. Airborne precautions are likely effective in reducing transmission, while other precautions such as hand-washing or cleaning surfaces with disinfectants are known to be effective in preventing rhinovirus transmission.

== Signs and symptoms ==
Rhinoviruses are the primary cause of the common cold. Symptoms include sore throat, runny nose, nasal congestion, sneezing and cough; sometimes accompanied by muscle aches, fatigue, malaise, headache, muscle weakness, or loss of appetite. Fever and extreme exhaustion are less common in rhinovirus infection compared to influenza, but rhinovirus can cause lower respiratory tract infection and the pneumonia can, in young children, be fatal.

== Epidemiology ==
Rhinoviruses are the primary agent responsible for the Common Cold, causing at least 50% of Cold infections, with some estimates putting the figure as high as 80%. Rhinoviruses can be detected year-round; however, the incidence of rhinovirus is higher in the autumn and winter, with most infections occurring between September and April in the northern hemisphere. The seasonality may be due to the start of the school year and to people spending more time indoors thereby increasing the chance of transmission of the virus. Lower ambient temperatures, especially outdoors, may also be a factor given that rhinoviruses preferentially replicate at 33 °C (91 °F) as opposed to 37 °C (99 °F). Other climate factors such as humidity may influence rhinovirus seasonality. Young children (<5 years old) experience a high rate of infection which can be detected in community surveillance studies of children up to 34% of the year. Phylogenetic analysis of rhinovirus strains in Nepalese infants revealed diverse lineages and patterns of virus circulation in low-resource settings. Those most affected by rhinoviruses are infants, the elderly, and immunocompromised people. Common Cold viruses have an estimated basic reproduction number ($R_0$) 2–3, meaning that each infected person typically infects 2–3 others. For Rhinoviruses, the estimated R0 value is in excess of 2.5, largely due to the high proportion of asymptomatic infections, which is estimated to be around 15–30% for children, and as high as 50% for adults.

== Pathogenesis ==
The primary route of entry for human rhinoviruses is the upper respiratory tract (mouth and nose). Rhinovirus A and B use "major" ICAM-1 (Inter-Cellular Adhesion Molecule 1), also known as CD54 (Cluster of Differentiation 54), on respiratory epithelial cells, as receptors to bind to. Some subgroups under A and B use the "minor" LDL receptor instead. Rhinovirus C uses cadherin-related family member 3 (CDHR3) to mediate cellular entry. As the virus replicates and spreads, infected cells release distress signals known as chemokines and cytokines (which in turn activate inflammatory mediators).

Infection occurs rapidly, with the virus adhering to surface receptors within 15 minutes of entering the respiratory tract. Just over 50% of individuals will experience symptoms within 2 days of infection. Only about 5% of cases will have an incubation period of less than 20 hours, and, at the other extreme, it is expected that 5% of cases would have an incubation period of greater than four and a half days.

Negative interference is known to occur between rhinovirus and influenza viruses. The 2009 Influenza Pandemic was interrupted in Europe by the annual autumn rhinovirus epidemic. Experiments in cell cultures show a rhinovirus infection can trigger an immune response which, when infected with influenza 3 days later, decreases the presence of influenza viral RNA 50,000-fold after 2 days compared to an unhindered influenza infection.

Human rhinoviruses preferentially grow at 33 °C (91.4 °F), notably colder than the average human body temperature of 37 °C (98.6 °F), hence the virus's tendency to infect the upper respiratory tract, where respiratory airflow is in continual contact with the (colder) extrasomatic environment.

Rhinovirus A and C species viruses are more strongly associated with significant illness and wheezing, while rhinovirus B species are more commonly mild or asymptomatic.

== Taxonomy ==
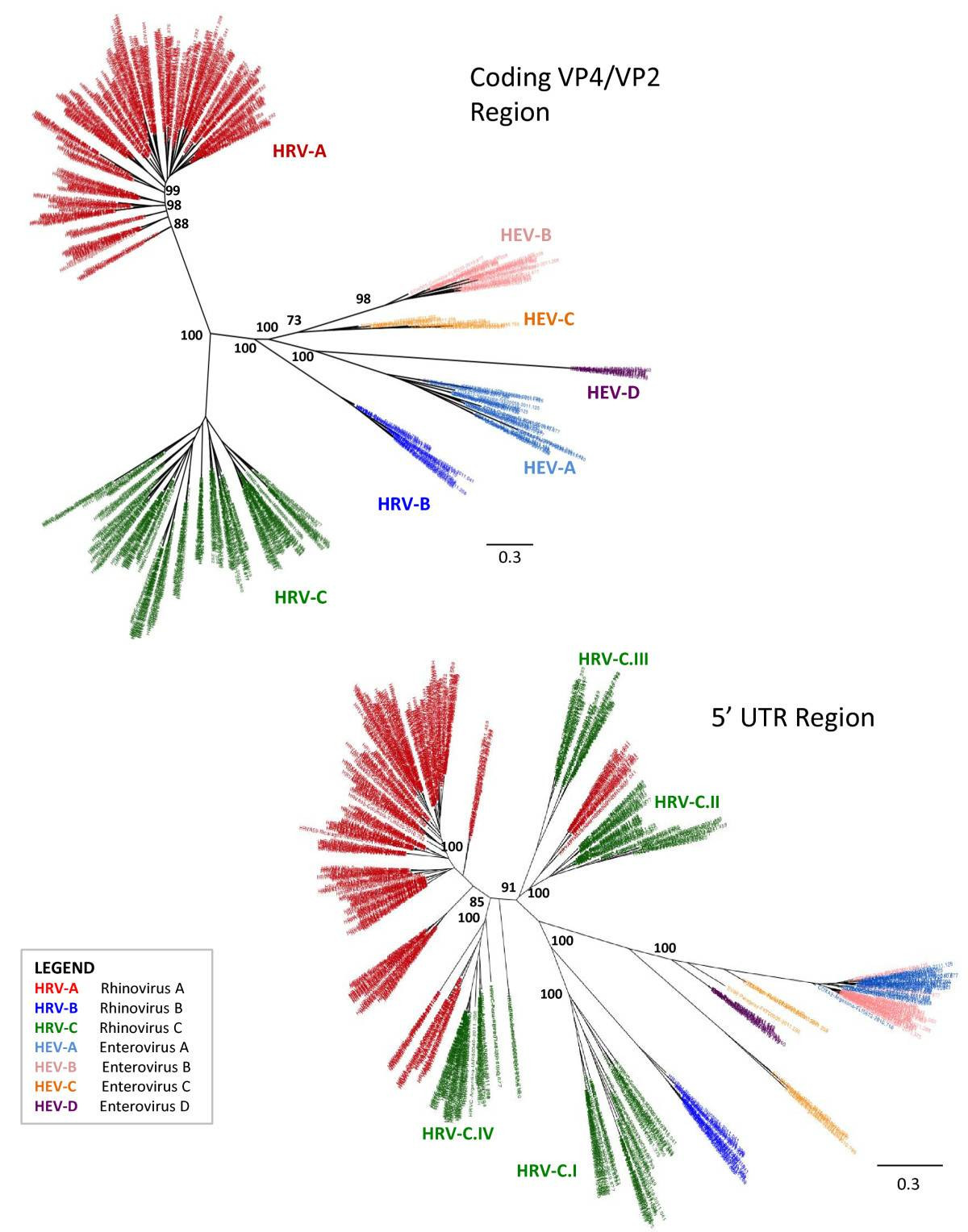
Maximum likelihood phylogenetic trees of enterovirus species A, B, C, D and rhinovirus A, B, C isolates from Latin America. The 5'UTR region is much more affected by recombination events than the VP4/VP2 coding sequence. The paraphyletic nature of "rhinovirus" is visible.

The International Committee on Taxonomy of Viruses (ICTV) defines rhinoviruses as three species within the genus Enterovirus:

- Enterovirus alpharhino (Rhinovirus A)
- Enterovirus betarhino (Rhinovirus B)
- Enterovirus cerhino (Rhinovirus C)

=== Types ===
Prior to 2020, enteroviruses (including all rhinoviruses) were categorized according to their serotype. In 2020 the ICTV ratified a proposal to classify all new types based on the genetic diversity of their VP1 gene. Human rhinovirus type names are of the form RV-Xn where X is the rhinovirus species (A, B, or C) and n is an index number. Species A and B have used the same index up to number 100, while species C has always used a separate index. Valid index numbers are as follows:

- Rhinovirus A: 1, 1B, 2, 7–13, 15, 16, 18–25, 28–34, 36, 38–41, 43–47, 49–51, 53–68, 71, 73–78, 80–82, 85, 88–90, 94–96, 100–108
- Rhinovirus B: 3–6, 14, 17, 26, 27, 35, 37, 42, 48, 52, 69, 70, 72, 79, 83, 84, 86, 91–93, 97, 99, 100-104
- Rhinovirus C: 1–57

== Structure ==
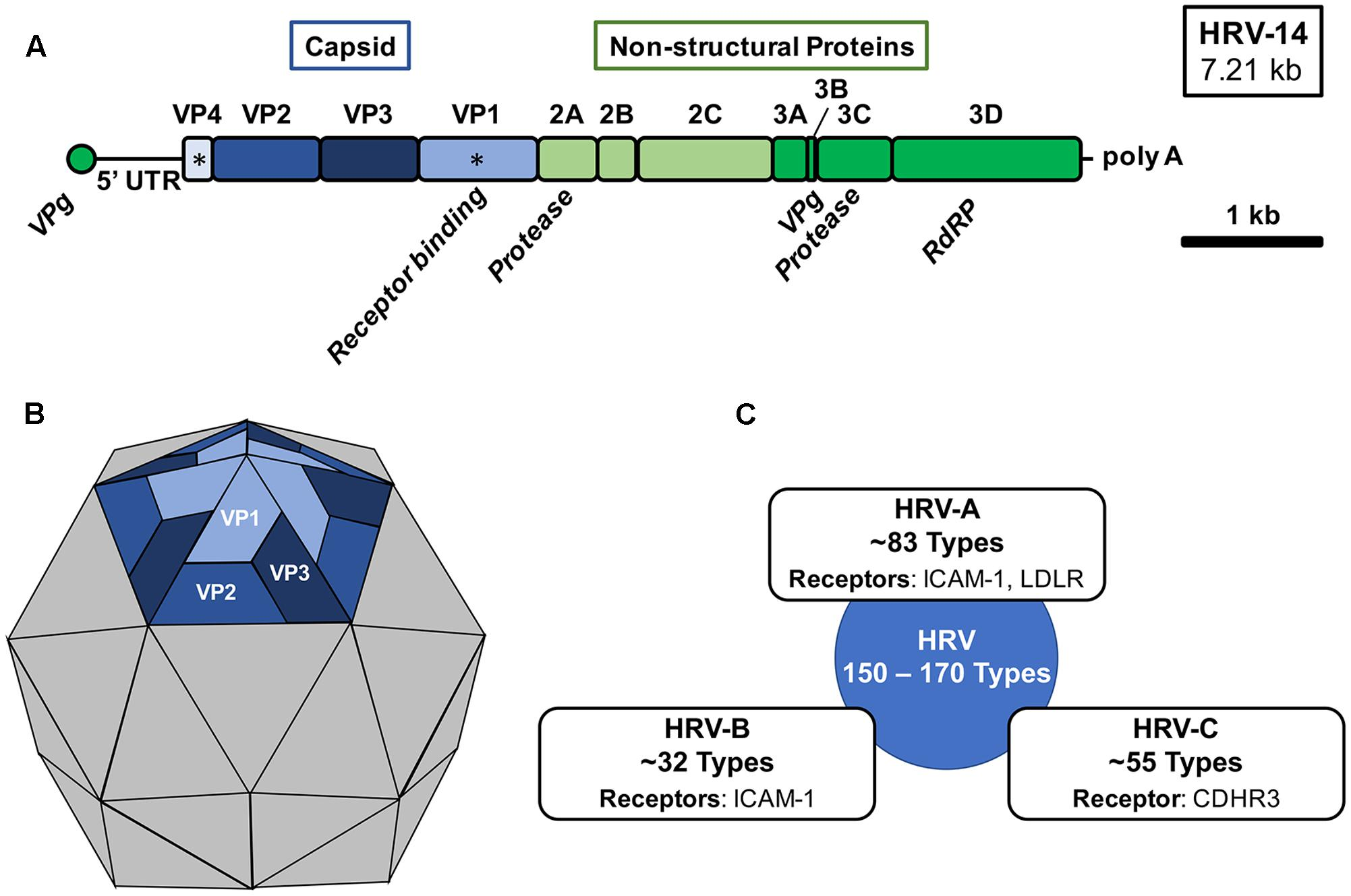
Human rhinovirus genome, virion structure, and species

Rhinoviruses have single-stranded positive sense RNA genomes of between 7200 and 8500 nucleotides in length. At the 5' end of the genome is a virus-encoded protein and, as in mammalian mRNA, there is a 3' poly-A tail. Structural proteins are encoded in the 5' region of the genome and non structural at the 3' end. This is the same for all picornaviruses. The viral particles themselves are not enveloped and are dodecahedral in structure.

The viral proteins are translated as a single long polypeptide, which is cleaved into the structural and nonstructural viral proteins.

The structure of the virus was determined in 1985 using x-ray crystallography by researchers at Purdue University and the University of Wisconsin led by Michael Rossmann. The virus was crystallized forming cubic crystals with four virus particles in each unit cell (space group P2_{1}3, no. 198), similar to a cubic close-packed arrangement.

Human rhinoviruses are composed of a capsid that contains four viral proteins, VP1, VP2, VP3 and VP4. VP1, VP2, and VP3 form the major part of the protein capsid. The much smaller VP4 protein has a more extended structure, and lies at the interface between the capsid and the RNA genome. There are 60 copies of each of these proteins assembled as an icosahedron. Antibodies are a major defense against infection with the epitopes lying on the exterior regions of VP1-VP3.

== Novel antiviral drugs ==
There are currently no FDA-approved antiviral drugs to treat rhinovirus infections. Several novel antiviral compounds have been tested in clinical trials without sufficient efficacy to progress to FDA approval. Compounds specifically targeted for rhinoviruses, or more broadly, picornaviruses, include the following:

- Rupintrivir is a peptidomimetic drug developed for treatment of rhinovirus infections. Rupintrivir inhibits human rhinovirus 3Cprotease and prevents cleavage of the rhinovirus polyprotein following translation, therefore preventing viral assembly and replication. A phase II clinical trial of rupintrivir using experimentally induced rhinovirus infection in healthy volunteers demonstrated efficacy in reducing viral load and symptom severity. However, further trials testing rupintrivir in treating natural infections showed minimal benefit, and further clinical development was halted.
- Pleconaril is an orally bioavailable antiviral drug developed for the treatment of infections caused by picornaviruses. This drug acts by binding to a hydrophobic pocket in VP1, and stabilizes the protein capsid to such an extent that the virus cannot release its RNA genome into the target cell. Phase III clinical trials showed a slight reduction in symptom duration if taken within 24 hours of symptom onset. However, the FDA denied approval of pleconaril due to concerns about side effects, limited efficacy in non-white participants, and difficulty in treating most patients within a 24 hour window.

Other treatments aiming to reduce rhinovirus infection symptoms include immunomodulatory agents. These may promote beneficial antiviral responses or reduce inflammatory responses associated with symptoms. Interferon-alpha used intranasally was shown to be effective against human rhinovirus infections. However, volunteers treated with this drug experienced some side effects, such as nasal bleeding and began developing tolerance to the drug. Subsequently, research into the treatment was abandoned. Inhaled budesonide has been shown to reduce viral load and pro-inflammatory IL-1β in mice. Omalizumab, which was developed for treatment of severe allergic asthma, has shown evidence in reducing symptom severity of asthma patients infected with rhinovirus.

== Vaccine development ==
There are no vaccines against these viruses as there is little-to-no cross-protection between serotypes. At least 165 types of human rhinoviruses are known. However, a study of the VP4 protein has shown it to be highly conserved among many serotypes of human rhinovirus, opening up the potential for a future pan-serotype human rhinovirus vaccine. A similar result was obtained with the VP1 protein. Like VP4, VP1 also occasionally "pokes" out of the viral particle, making it available to neutralizing antibodies. Both peptides have been tested on rabbits, resulting in successful generation of cross-serotype antibodies.

Rhinovirus genome has a high rate of variability in human circulation, even occurring with genomic sequences that differ up to 30%. Recent studies have identified conserved regions of the rhinovirus genome; this, along with an adjuvanted polyvalent rhinovirus vaccine, shows potential for future development in vaccine treatment.

== Prevention ==
Human rhinovirus can remain infectious for up to three hours outside of a human host. Once the virus is contracted, a person is most contagious within the first three days. Preventative measures such as regular vigorous handwashing with soap and water may aid in avoiding infection. Avoiding touching the mouth, eyes, and nose (the most common entry points for rhinovirus) may also assist prevention. Droplet precautions, which take the form of a surgical mask and gloves, are the method used in major hospitals. As with all respiratory pathogens once presumed to transmit via respiratory droplets, it is highly likely to be carried by the aerosols generated during routine breathing, talking, and even singing. In order to prevent airborne transmission, droplet precautions are insufficient, and routine airborne precautions are necessary.

== See also ==
- Orthomyxoviridae (Influenza viruses)
- Respiratory syncytial virus
- Coronavirus
- Norovirus
