= Mildred W. Wells =

American aerobiologist

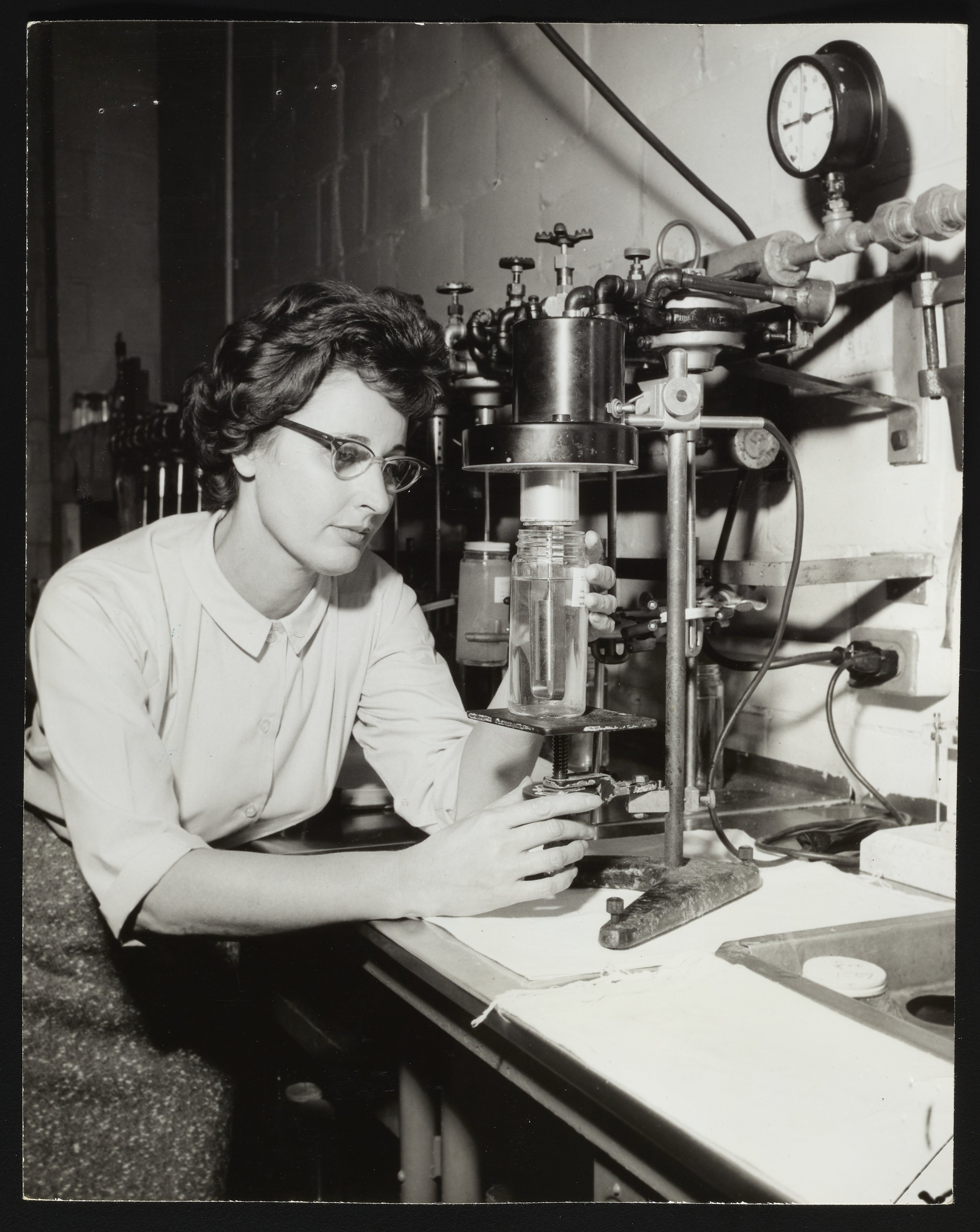
- Born: Mildred Washington Weeks; October 1, 1891
- Died: February 23, 1957 (aged 65); Dover, Kent, Delaware, United States

Academic background
- Education: University of Texas at Austin

Academic work
- Discipline: Biologist, Epidemiologist
- Sub-discipline: Aerobiology, Bacteriology
- Institutions: Harvard School of Public Health; University of Pennsylvania; Johns Hopkins University

Mildred W. Wells (c. October 1, 1891 – 23 February 1957), born Mildred Washington Weeks, was an American scientist and public health researcher who is best known for her work on the transmission of airborne disease. A trained physician and a critical collaborator with her husband, William Firth Wells, she played a foundational role in developing the science behind droplet and aerosol behavior, now central to understanding the spread of respiratory infections like measles and tuberculosis. Her research into indoor air quality, ventilation, and germicidal ultraviolet light helped establish modern approaches to infection control. Relative to husband, her contributions to aerobiology and infection control are historically under-recognized, however she is increasingly acknowledged as an equally key figure in the development of both of these fields.

== Early life, education, and family ==
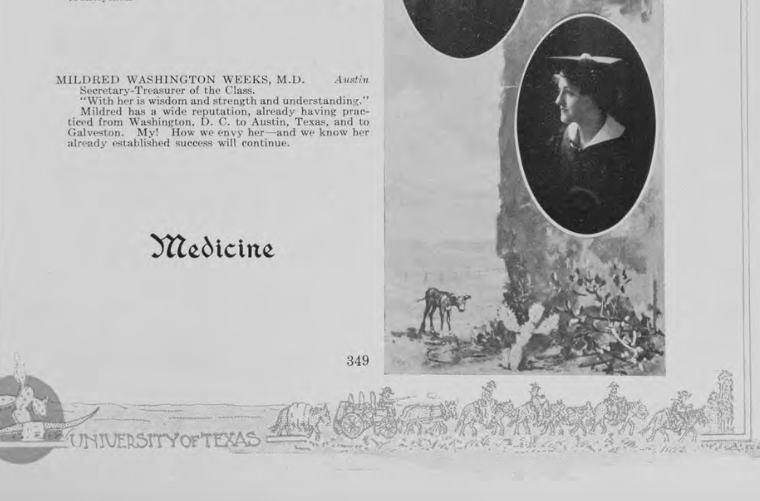
Mildred Weeks is documented in the University of Texas at Austin yearbook, The Cactus, in the year 1915.

Wells was born in Indian Territory in 1891. She grew up in a wealthy Texan family as the daughter of William W. Weeks and Mary Alice Denton. Her great-grandfather was John Bunyan Denton, the namesake of the city and county of Denton, Texas. She received her undergraduate education at University of Texas Medical Branch, graduating in 1911, and went on to receive her doctoral education at University of Texas at Austin.

After receiving her doctorate in 1915, Wells moved to Washington, D.C. to work at the bacteriology lab of Earle Phelps at the United States Public Health Service. She soon after met William F. Wells and the two married on April 9, 1917. They had one son, William F. Wells Jr, born in 1918.

== Scientific career ==
=== Aerobiology research ===
In the 1920s and 1930s, Wells emerged as a specialist in airborne infectious diseases. Working at the Harvard School of Public Health, she and William Wells began a series of experiments to determine how pathogens travel through the air. By the early 1930s, the Wells team had developed a systematic, physics-based approach to study respiratory droplets. Using innovative air-sampling techniques (including a specially designed centrifuge apparatus), they gathered evidence that infectious agents expelled in coughs and sneezes could remain suspended in air as microscopic particles. This work led the Wellses to challenge the prevailing belief that respiratory illnesses spread only via large, short-range droplets. In 1936, they published the landmark paper "Air-Borne Infection," which provided experimental proof that aerosolized droplets (droplet nuclei) can carry live pathogens over distance. Encapsulating this research together, Wells is credited alongside her husband as having developed the Wells curve—a graphical description of what happens to droplets over time (how they evaporate, shrink, and become airborne nuclei).

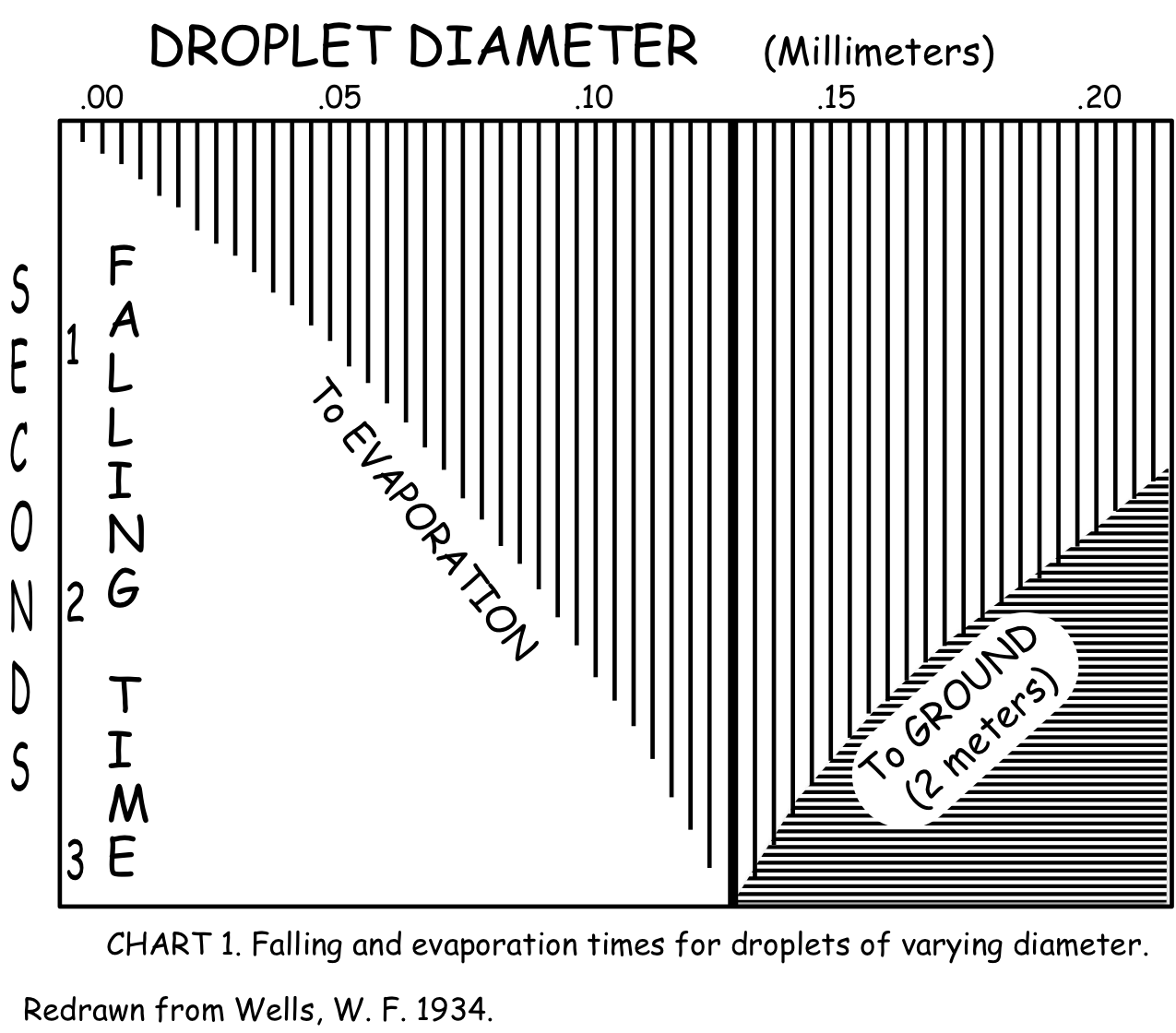
The Wells curve

=== Ventilation research ===
In addition to aerosol behavior, Wells studied air ventilation in indoor spaces after recognizing that air circulation could dilute or concentrate airborne pathogens. She co-authored "Measurement of Sanitary Ventilation" in 1938 with William Wells, a study that introduced quantitative methods to evaluate how well a building's ventilation removes airborne pathogens. In the 1940s, Dr. Wells led an extensive, decade-long field study on respiratory infections in schoolchildren, focusing on measles and chickenpox outbreaks in relation to classroom ventilation. Two influential papers arose from this work: "The Seasonal Patterns of Measles and Chicken Pox" and "Ventilation in the Spread of Chickenpox and Measles within School Rooms". In these studies, Wells analyzed epidemiological data from school communities and demonstrated that poor ventilation correlated with higher transmission of airborne disease. Her findings, ahead of their time, suggested that improving indoor air quality (for example, by increasing fresh air exchange in classrooms) could reduce the incidence of common respiratory infections. This body of work established Wells a forerunner in the indoor air quality field.

=== Ultraviolet germicidal light research ===
Another significant facet of Wells' work was the exploration of ultraviolet germicidal irradiation (UVGI). While working at Harvard in the mid-1930s, the Wellses discovered that airborne pathogens could be killed by short-wave UV. In 1935, William F. Wells demonstrated that airborne bacteria exposed to ultraviolet light were rapidly inactivated. During 1937–1941, Wells and her colleagues installed upper-room UV lamps in schools to test whether continuous ultraviolet irradiation could prevent outbreaks. In one of these studies, UVGI lamps were used in one set of school buildings but not in another. The study found that classrooms with germicidal UV light had markedly lower transmission of measles compared to control schools. This was one of the first real-world demonstrations that sterilizing the air could reduce the spread of disease. However, when other researchers attempted to replicate the UV intervention in different schools, they often obtained mixed results, partly due to experimental design flaws (for example, failing to account for children's exposure outside of classrooms). These inconsistencies, combined with the post-war advent of vaccines and antibiotics, caused public health experts to become skeptical about UV air disinfection. Wells nonetheless remained a proponent of UVGI as a preventive tool against airborne disease. Her early contributions helped establish the biological basis for UVGI, and subsequently, far-UVC technologies that would see renewed interest decades later for controlling tuberculosis and, most recently, COVID-19.

== Later life and legacy ==
Wells' contributions to science were significant yet remained largely in the shadow of her more famous husband for many years. She died in February 1957, at the age of 65. Her past obscurity has been aided by contrarian nature of the Wellses' ideas on how disease is transmitted. Counter to the prevailing thoughts at the time that pathogens spread via contact and droplet transmission, the Wellses proposed a model that some influential public health figures interpreted as a dubious reclamation of miasma theory.

Over the ensuing decades, however, Wells' legacy has grown. In the late 20th century, epidemiologists like Richard L. Riley, Edward Nardell, and Donald Milton built upon the Wellses' concepts to conclusively demonstrate airborne transmission of tuberculosis, vindicating the earlier insights of William and Wells. The Wells-Riley model, a seminal model for airborne disease transmission formulated in the 1970s, traces its intellectual roots to the droplet nucleus theory first articulated by the Wells duo. Yet historically, credit for these ideas was disproportionately given to William F. Wells.

It is only in recent years that Wells' role has begun to be fully recognized. Renewed interest sparked by the COVID-19 pandemic prompted public health experts and writers to reexamine early research on aerosols. This led to a resurgence of attention to the Wellses. Illustrating this is Carl Zimmer's 2025 book Airborne: The Hidden History of the Life We Breathe. In the book, Zimmer underscores that the Wellses' pioneering work failed to gain traction initially not because of lack of merit, but due to scientific misjudgments of the era and personal factors.
