= Wells curve =

Science of medicine

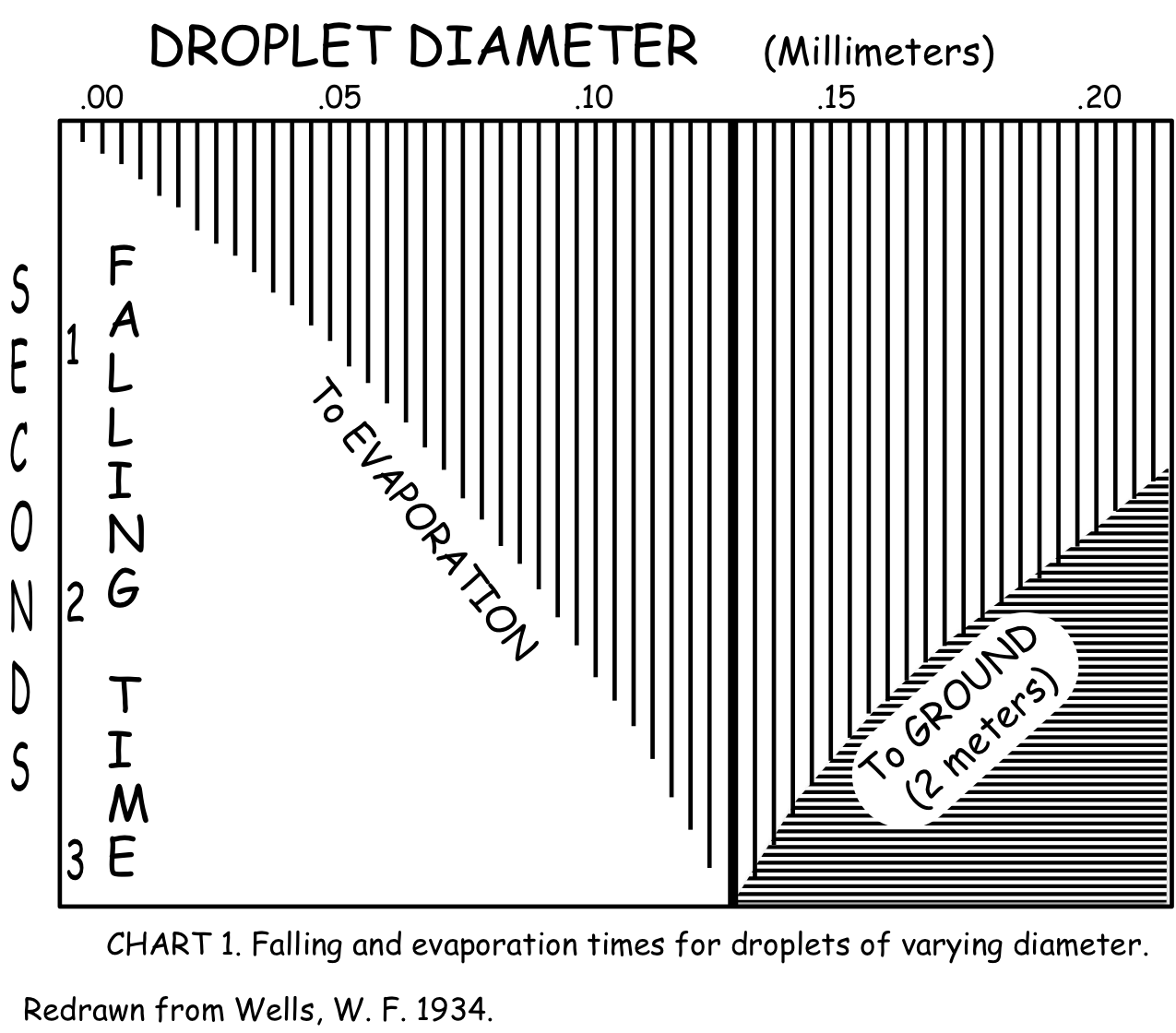
The Wells curve demonstrates that respiratory droplets rapidly dry out or fall to the ground after being exhaled.

The Wells curve (or Wells evaporation falling curve of droplets) is a diagram, developed by W. F. Wells in 1934, which describes what is expected to happen to small droplets once they have been exhaled into air. Coughing, sneezing, and other violent exhalations produce high numbers of respiratory droplets derived from saliva and/or respiratory mucus, with sizes ranging from about 1 μm to 2 mm. Wells' insight was that such droplets would have two distinct fates, depending on their sizes. The interplay of gravity and evaporation means that droplets larger than a humidity-determined threshold size would fall to the ground due to gravity, while droplets smaller than this size would quickly evaporate, leaving a dry residue that drifts in the air. Since droplets from an infected person may contain infectious bacteria or viruses, these processes influence transmission of respiratory diseases.

A traditional hard size cutoff of 5 μm between airborne and respiratory droplets has been criticized as a false dichotomy not grounded in science, as exhaled particles form a continuum of sizes whose fates depend on environmental conditions in addition to their initial sizes. However, it has informed hospital based transmission based precautions for decades.

== Background ==
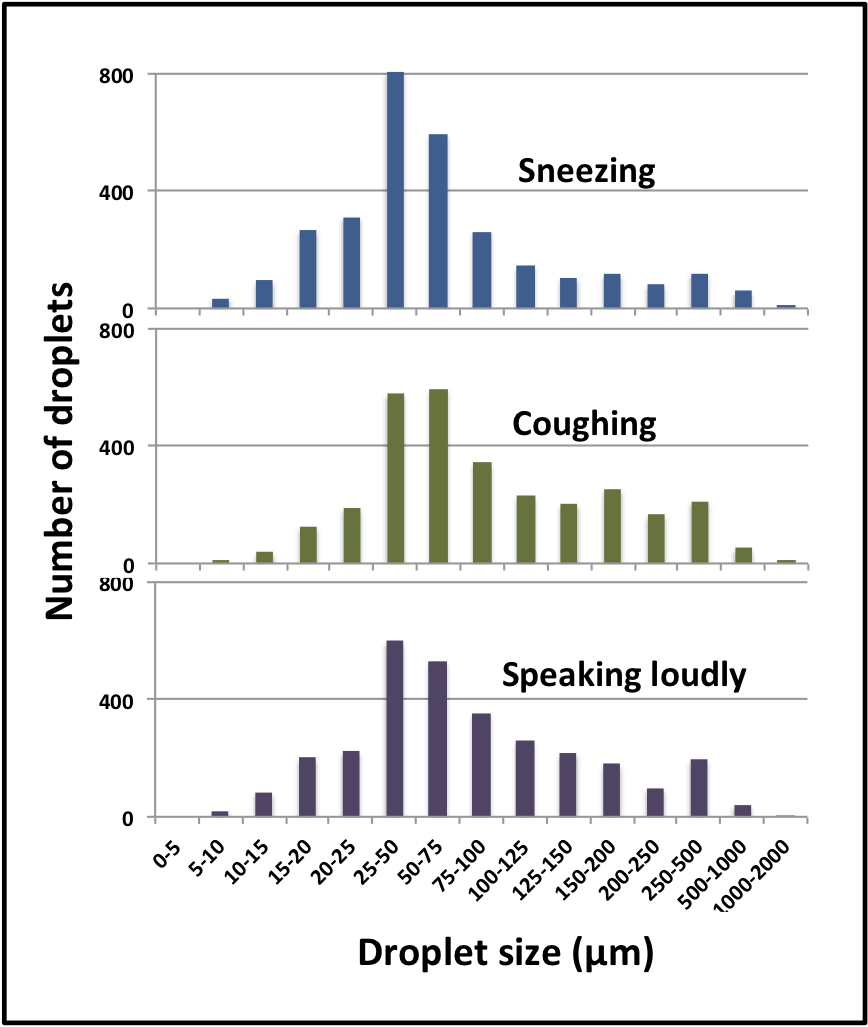
Each histogram shows the size distribution of 3000 respiratory droplets produced by the specified activity. Data from Duguid 1946

Quiet breathing produces few droplets, but forced exhalations such as sneezing, coughing, shouting and singing can produce many thousands or even millions of small droplets. Droplets from healthy people consist of saliva from the mouth and/or the mucus that lines the respiratory tract. Saliva is >99% water, with small amounts of salts, proteins and other molecules. Respiratory mucus is more complex, 95% water with large amounts of mucin proteins and varying amounts of other proteins, especially antibodies, as well as lipids and nucleic acids, both secreted and derived from dead airway cells. Sizes of respiratory droplets vary widely, from greater than 1 mm to less than 1 μm, but the distribution of sizes is roughly similar across different droplet-generating activities.

== The Wells curve: the effects of gravity and evaporation ==
In undisturbed moisture-saturated air, all respiratory droplets fall due to gravity until they reach the ground or another horizontal surface. For all but the largest droplets, Stokes Law predicts that falling speeds quickly reach a limit set by the ratio of mass to cross-sectional area, with small droplets falling much more slowly than large ones.

Falling times of droplets in water-saturated air (data from Duguid 1946)
Size of droplet (mm)	Time to fall 2 m
≥1.0	≤0.6 sec
0.1	6 sec
0.01	10 min
0.001	16.6 hr

If the air is not saturated with water vapor, all droplets are also subject to evaporation as they fall, which gradually decreases their mass and thus slows the rate at which they are falling. Sufficiently large droplets still reach the ground or another surface, where they continue to dry, leaving potentially infectious residues called fomites. However, the high surface area to volume ratios of small droplets cause them to evaporate so rapidly that they dry out before they reach the ground. The dry residues of such droplets (called 'droplet nuclei' or 'aerosol particles') then cease falling and drift with the surrounding air. Thus, the continuous distribution of droplet sizes rapidly produces just two dichotomous outcomes, fomites on surfaces and droplet nuclei floating in the air.

Wells summarized this relationship graphically, with droplet size on the X-axis and time to evaporate or fall to the ground on the Y-axis. The result is a pair of curves intersecting at the droplet size that evaporates exactly as it hits the ground.

=== Implications for epidemiology ===
Wells' insight was widely adopted because of its relevance for the spread of respiratory infections. The efficiency of transmission of specific viruses and bacteria depends both on the types of droplets and droplet nuclei they cause and on their ability to survive in droplets, droplet nuclei and fomites. Diseases such as measles, whose causative viruses remain highly infectious in droplet nuclei, can be spread without personal contact, across a room or through ventilation systems and are said to have airborne transmission. Although later studies demonstrated that the droplet size at which evaporation outpaces falling is smaller than that described by Wells, and the settling time is longer, his work remains important for understanding the physics of respiratory droplets.

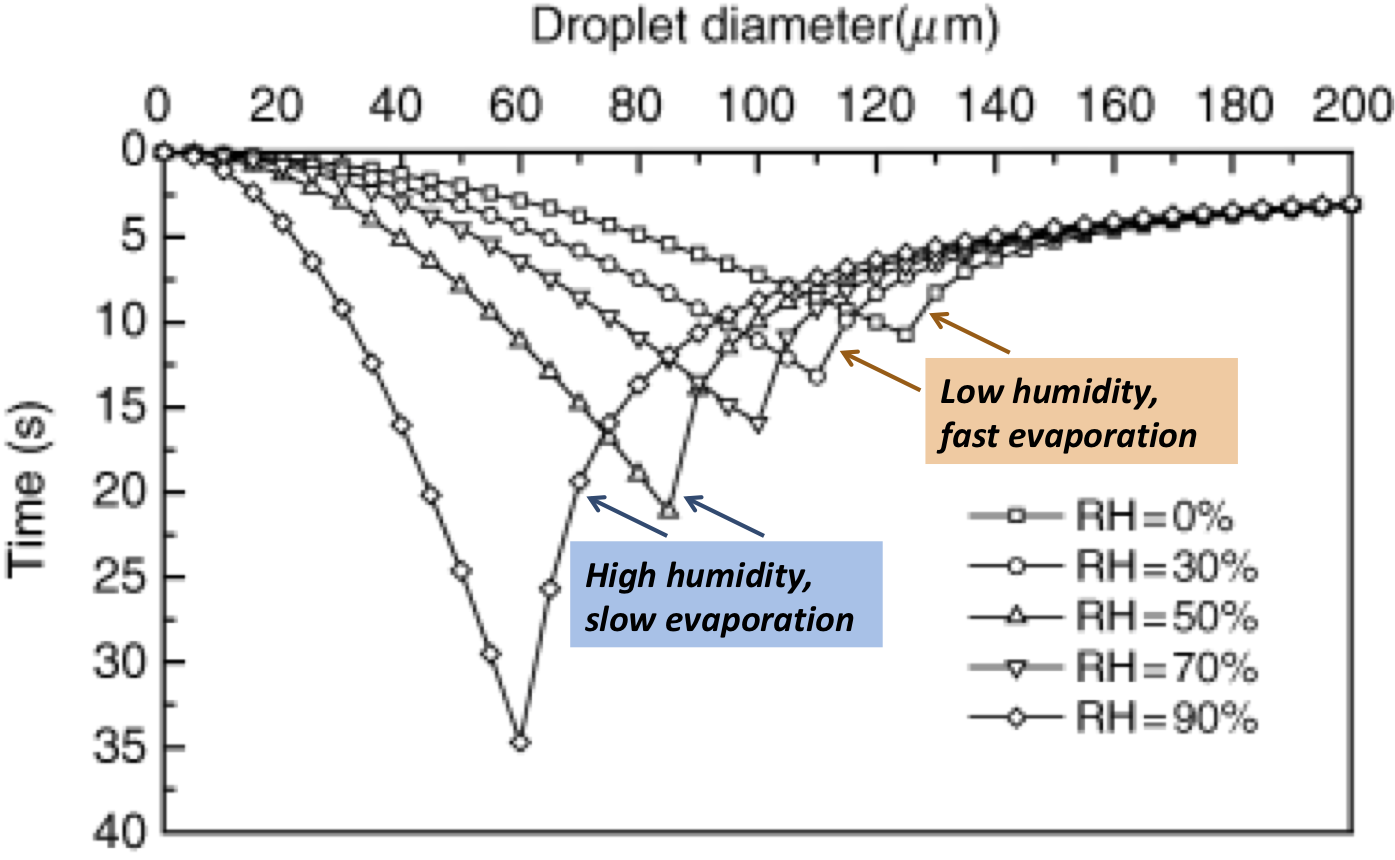
Wells curves for different relative humidities

=== Complicating factors ===
Relative humidity: The effective distinction between 'large' and 'small' droplets depends on the humidity. Exhaled air has become saturated with water vapour during its passage through the respiratory tract, but indoor or outdoor air is usually much less humid. Under 0% humidity, only droplets 125 μm or larger will reach the ground, but the threshold falls to 60 μm for 90% humidity. Since most respiratory droplets are smaller than 75 μm, even at high humidity most droplets will dry out and become airborne.

Movement of exhaled and ambient air: Air that has been violently expelled by a cough or sneeze moves as a turbulent cloud through the ambient air. Such clouds can travel up to several meters, with large droplets falling from the cloud and small ones gradually dispersing and evaporating as they mix with ambient air. The internal turbulence of such clouds may also delay the fall of large droplets, increasing the chance that they will evaporate before reaching the ground. Since exhaled air is usually warmer and thus less dense than the ambient air, such clouds usually also rise. Droplets and dry particles in exhaled air are also dispersed by movement of the ambient air, due to winds and convection currents.

=== Effects of face shields, masks and respirators ===
A face shield protects the wearer against impacts by large droplets that may be expelled horizontally by an infected person's cough or sneeze or during medical treatments. Since the shield is an impermeable barrier that air must travel around, it provides little protection against small droplets and dry particles that travel with the air. Surgical masks and home-made masks can filter out large and small droplets, but their pores are too large to block passage of small aerosol particles. They are thought to be more effective when worn by an infected person, preventing release of infectious droplets, than when worn by an uninfected person to protect against infection. Air that travels around a poorly fitting mask is not filtered, nor is violently expelled air produced by a cough or sneeze. N-95 respirator masks are designed to filter out even small dry particles, but they must be individually fitted and checked to prevent leakage of air around the sides.
