= Wells-Riley model =

Model of airborne disease transmission

The Wells-Riley model is a simple model of the airborne transmission of infectious diseases, developed by William F. Wells and Richard L. Riley for tuberculosis and measles.

Wells-Riley can also be applied to other diseases transmitted in the air, such as COVID-19. The model describes the situation where one or more infected people are sharing a room (and so the room air) with other people who are susceptible to infection. It makes predictions for the probability that a susceptible person becomes infected. The prediction is that infection is more likely for small poorly ventilated rooms, and if the infected person is highly infectious.

The Wells-Riley is a highly simplified model of a very complex process, but does at least make predictions for how the probability of infection varies with things within our control, such as room ventilation.

== Description of model ==
Wells-Riley assumes that the air contains doses of the infectious bacterium or virus, and that you become infected if you breathe one dose in, i.e., the probability a person becomes infected, $P_i$, is given by

$P_i= \mbox{probability one or more doses are inhaled}$

This dose is not a single bacterium or virus, but however many are needed to start an infection. These infectious doses are sometimes called 'quanta' - no relation to quantum physics. The doses are breathed out or otherwise emitted by the infectious person into the air of the room, such that in the room there is a concentration $c_{DOSE}$ of these doses per unit volume of the air. If you are breathing in air at volume rate $B$, then after a time $t_R$ in the room, the

$\mbox{mean number of doses inhaled}= c_{DOSE}Bt_R$

The Wells-Riley then relies on standard Poisson statistics which predicts for the probability of infection

$P_i=1-\exp\left(-c_{DOSE}Bt_R\right)$

after a time $t_R$ in the room. This is just the Poisson statistics expression for the probability of one or more doses being inhaled, once we know the mean number.

So the prediction is that you are more likely to become infected if the concentration of infectious doses in the room air is high, or if you spend longer in the room. The concentration of doses will tend to be high in small, poorly ventilated rooms, and smaller in larger, better ventilated rooms.

== Relation of the Wells-Riley model to epidemiology ==
Note that the Wells-Riley model approaches transmission of an airborne diseases as a physical transport problem, i.e., as the problem of how a virus or bacterium gets from one human body to another.

For transmission of COVID-19, for example, this would be how a virus breathed out by an infected person, can cross a room and be breathed in by a susceptible person. This is a different approach from that taken in the epidemiology of infectious diseases, which may gather information about who (e.g., nurses, factory workers) becomes infected, in what situations (e.g., the home, factories), and understand the spread of a disease in those terms - without considering how a virus or bacterium actually gets from one person to another.

However, the probability of infection predicted by the Wells-Riley model is close to the attack rate (also called secondary attack rate, and note that this 'rate' is a probability not a rate) in epidemiology. Compare the definition of $P_i$ in this page with the definition of the attack rate.

== Mechanism of transmission of infectious diseases through the air ==
Wells-Riley is only applicable for transmission directly via the air, not via the susceptible person picking up the infectious agent from a surface (fomite transmission). Because the model assumes the air is well mixed it does not account for the region within one or two metres of an infected person, having a higher concentration of the infectious agent. Breathing and speaking produce a cone of warm (body temperature), humid air that moves out into and dissipates into the room air over a distance of about one to two metres, while a sneeze, with its much faster moving air, produces air movement up to metres away. If the person breathing/speaking/sneezing is infected then an infectious agent such as tuberculosis bacterium or a respiratory virus is expected to be more concentrated in this cone of air, but the infectious agent can also (at least in some cases) spread into the room air.

== Assumptions made by the Wells-Riley model ==
Estimating the number of inhaled doses requires more assumptions. The assumptions made by the model are essentially:

- That the air contains the infectious agent in the form of doses of fixed size.
- That infection occurs whenever a dose is breathed in.
- That an infected person breathes out doses at some constant rate $r_{DOUT}$.
- That the air inside the room is well-mixed, i.e., that when these doses are breathed out, they rapidly become uniformly distributed in the air.
- That the doses have some lifetime $\tau$, before being removed. This is due to a combination of the infectious agent leaving the air, and it decaying/dying.
- That the air is at steady state, i.e., concentration of doses in the air is not changing with time.

Assumptions 4 to 6 mean that the concentration of doses in the room air, $c_{DOSE}$, is

$c_{DOSE}=\frac{r_{DOUT}\tau}{V_{ROOM}}$

Doses can be removed in three ways:

- The infectious agent can decay or die. Viruses in particular are known to be fragile and often short-lived outside their host.
- The dose can fall from the air onto a surface such as the floor.
- Room ventilation or filtration can either remove the air containing the dose to the outside, or filter the dose from the air.

Assuming we can add the rates of these processes

$\frac{1}{\tau}=\frac{1}{\tau_D}+\frac{1}{\tau_F}+\frac{1}{\tau_{VF}}$

for $\tau_D$ the lifetime of the infectious agent in air, $\tau_F$ the lifetime of a dose in the air before settling onto a surface or the floor, and $\tau_{VF}$ the lifetime of the dose before it is removed by room ventilation or filtration. Then the concentration of doses is

$c_{DOSE}=\frac{r_{DOUT}}{V_{ROOM}\left(1/\tau_D+1/\tau_F+1/\tau_{VF}\right)}$

If the susceptible person spends a time $t_R$ inside the room and inhales air at a rate (volume per unit time) $B$ then they inhale a volume $B t_R$ and so a number of infectious doses

$\mbox{mean number of inhaled doses}=c_{DOSE}Bt_R$

or

$\mbox{mean number of inhaled doses}=\frac{r_{DOUT}Bt_R}{V_{ROOM}\left(1/\tau_D+1/\tau_F+1/\tau_{VF}\right)}$

== Prediction equation ==
Putting all this together, the Wells-Riley prediction for the probability of infection is

$P_i=1-\exp\left(-\frac{r_{DOUT}Bt_R}{V_{ROOM}\left(1/\tau_D+1/\tau_F+1/\tau_{VF}\right)}\right)$

where:

- $r_{DOUT}$ is breathing out rate of an infected person
- $B$ is a person inhaling rate
- $t_R$ is the time a person spends in the room
- $V_{ROOM}$ is the volume of the room
- $\tau_D$ is the lifetime of the infectious agent in the air
- $\tau_F$ is the lifetime of a dose in the air before settling on a surface
- $\tau_{VF}$ is the lifetime of a dose before it is removed from the room by ventilation or filtration

The lifetime of room air $\tau_{VF}$ is just one over the air changes per hour - one measure of how well ventilated a room is. Building standards recommend several air changes per hour, in which case $\tau_{VF}$ will be tens of minutes.

== Relation to carbon dioxide concentration in a room ==
The Wells-Riley model assumes that an infected person continuously breathes out infectious virus. They will also continuously breathe out carbon dioxide, and so excess carbon dioxide concentration has been proposed as a proxy infection risk. In other words, the higher the carbon dioxide concentration in a room, the higher the risk of infection by an airborne disease. The excess concentration of carbon dioxide is that over the background level in the Earth's atmosphere, which is assumed to come from human respiration (in the absence of another source such as fire). Then the excess concentration of carbon dioxide $c_{CO2}^{(ex)}$ is

$c_{CO2}^{(ex)}=\frac{N_P r_{CO2}\tau_{VF}}{V_{ROOM}}=\frac{N_P Bc_{CO2}^{(breath)}\tau_{VF}}{V_{ROOM}}$

for $N_P$ people each exhaling carbon dioxide at a rate $r_{CO2}$. Carbon dioxide neither sediments out (it is a molecule) nor decays, leaving ventilation as the only process that removes it. In the second equality we used $r_{CO2}=Bc_{CO2}^{(breath)}$, i.e., the rate of production of carbon dioxide is the breathing rate (volume of air exhaled per second = volume of air inhaled per second) $B$ times the concentration of carbon dioxide in exhaled breath $c_{CO2}^{(breath)}\simeq 40,000~\mbox{ppm}$. Note that this implies that we can estimate how well ventilated a room is if we know how many people are in the room, and the room's volume, from

$\frac{1}{\tau_{VF}}=\frac{N_P Bc_{CO2}^{(breath)}}{c_{CO2}^{(ex)}V_{ROOM}}$

If for the virus ventilation is the dominant route for removal of the virus, i.e., $\tau_D, \tau_F \gg \tau_{VF}$, the Wells-Riley prediction for the infection probability is then

$P_i=1-\exp\left(-\frac{c^{(ex)}_{CO2}r_{DOUT}t_R}{c_{CO2}^{(breath)}N_P}\right) ~~~~~~\tau_D, \tau_F \gg \tau_{VF}$

which predicts that the higher the room concentration of carbon dioxide, the higher the infection risk.

== Application to COVID-19 ==
Although originally developed for other diseases such as tuberculosis, Wells-Riley has been applied to try and understand transmission of COVID-19, notably for a superspreading event in a chorale rehearsal in Skagit Valley (USA).

The Wells-Riley model is implemented as an interactive Google Sheets spreadsheet, and interactive apps showing estimates of the probability of infection. Even for the simple Wells-Riley model, the infection probability, $P_i$, depends on seven parameters. The probability of becoming infected is predicted to increase with how infectious the person is ($r_{DOUT}$ - which may peak around the time of the onset of symptoms and is likely to vary hugely from one infectious person to another, how rapidly they are breathing (which for example will increase with exercise), the length of the time they are in the room, as well as the lifetime of the virus in the room air.

This lifetime can be reduced by both ventilation and by removing the virus by filtration. Large rooms also dilute the infectious agent and so reduce risk - although this assumes that the air is well mixed - a highly approximate assumption. A study of a COVID-19 transmission event in a restaurant in Guangzhou, went beyond this well-mixed approximation, to show that a group of three tables shared air with each other, to a greater extent than with the remainder of the (poorly ventilated) restaurant. One infected person on one of these tables (a few metres apart) infected people on the other two tables.

The COVID-19 pandemic has led to work on improving the Wells-Riley model to account for factors such as the virus being in droplets of varying size which have varying lifetimes, and an improved model also has an interactive app.
