= Respiratory droplet =

Type of particle formed by breathing

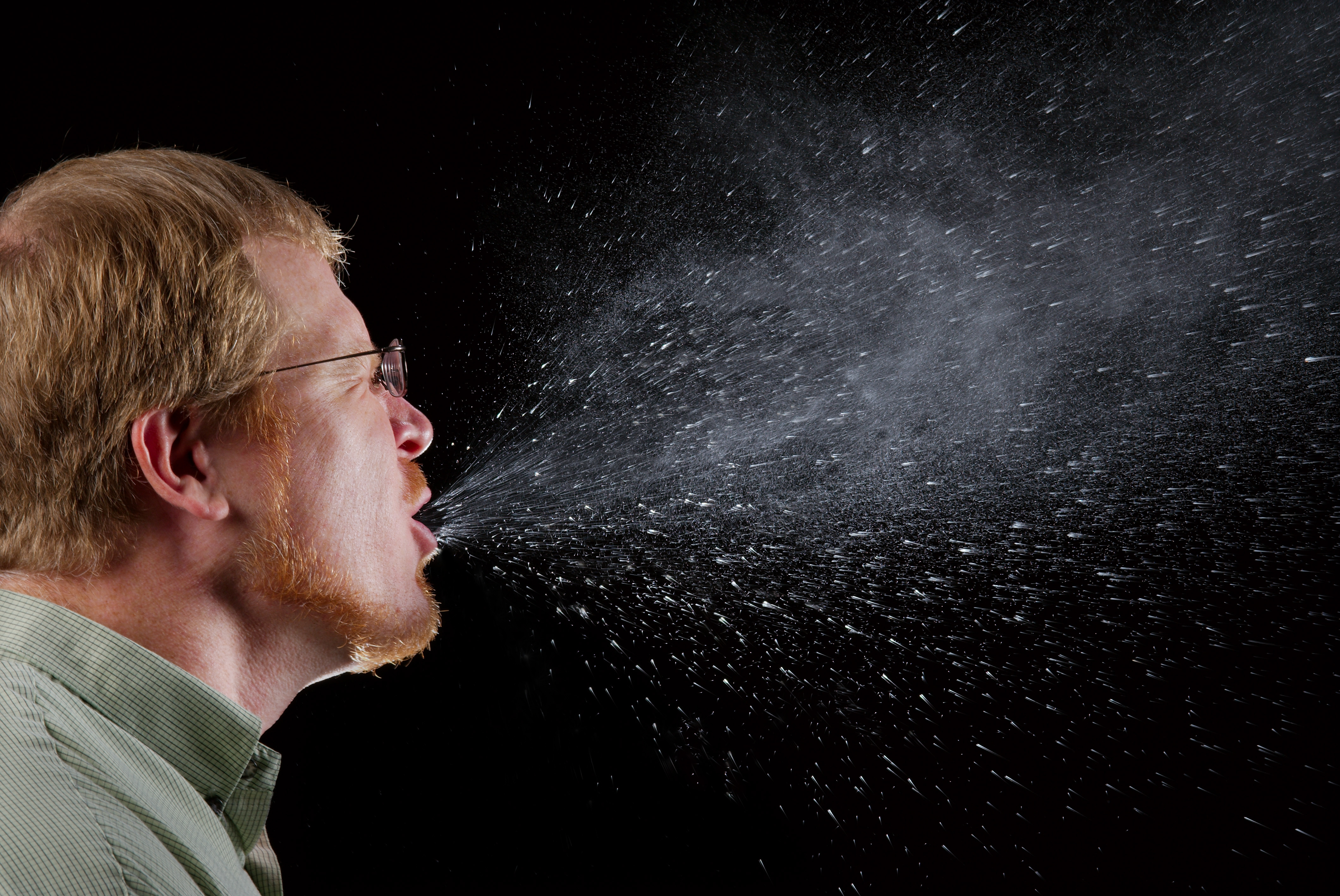
Some infectious diseases can be spread via respiratory droplets expelled from the mouth and nose, as when a person sneezes.

A respiratory droplet is a small aqueous droplet produced by exhalation, consisting of saliva or mucus and other matter derived from respiratory tract surfaces. Respiratory droplets are produced naturally as a result of breathing, speaking (speech droplet), sneezing, coughing, or vomiting, so they are always present in our breath, but speaking and coughing increase their number.

Droplet sizes range from < 1 μm to 1000 μm, and in typical breath there are around 100 droplets per litre of breath. So for a breathing rate of 10 litres per minute this means roughly 1000 droplets per minute, the vast majority of which are a few micrometres across or smaller. As these droplets are suspended in air, they are all by definition aerosols. However, large droplets (larger than about 100 μm, but depending on conditions) rapidly fall to the ground or another surface and so are only briefly suspended, while droplets much smaller than 100 μm (which is most of them) fall only slowly and so form aerosols with lifetimes of minutes or more, or at intermediate size, may initially travel like aerosols but at a distance fall to the ground like droplets ("jet riders").

These droplets can contain infectious bacterial cells or virus particles they are important factors in the transmission of respiratory diseases. In some cases, in the study of disease transmission a distinction between what are called "respiratory droplets" and what are called "aerosols" is made, with only larger droplets referred to as "respiratory droplets" and smaller ones referred to as "aerosols" but this arbitrary distinction has never been supported experimentally or theoretically, and is not consistent with the standard definition of an aerosol.

== Description ==
Respiratory droplets from humans include various cells types (e.g. epithelial cells and cells of the immune system), physiological electrolytes contained in mucus and saliva (e.g. Na^{+}, K^{+}, Cl^{−}), and, potentially, various pathogens.

Droplets that dry in the air become droplet nuclei which float as aerosols and can remain suspended in air for considerable periods of time.

The probability density function for droplets in the breath of someone speaking, as a function of diameter. Note that both axes are log scales, we breathe out droplets ranging in size from less than a micrometre to around a millimetre, and that we breathe out many more droplets around a micrometre across than larger droplets. Only the largest droplets, around a millimetre in size are visible, we cannot see the smaller ones.

The traditional hard size cutoff of 5 μm between airborne and respiratory droplets has been criticized as a false dichotomy not grounded in science, as exhaled particles form a continuum of sizes whose fates depend on environmental conditions in addition to their initial sizes. However, it has informed hospital based transmission based precautions for decades.

== Formation ==
Respiratory droplets can be produced in many ways. They can be produced naturally as a result of breathing, talking, sneezing, coughing, or singing. They can also be artificially generated in healthcare settings by aerosol-generating procedures such as intubation, cardiopulmonary resuscitation (CPR), bronchoscopy, surgery, and autopsy. Similar droplets may be formed through vomiting, flushing toilets, wet-cleaning surfaces, showering or using tap water, or spraying graywater for agricultural purposes.

Depending on the method of formation, respiratory droplets may also contain salts, cells, and virus particles. In the case of naturally produced droplets, they can originate from different locations in the respiratory tract, which may affect their content. There may also be differences between healthy and diseased individuals in their mucus content, quantity, and viscosity that affects droplet formation.

== Transport ==
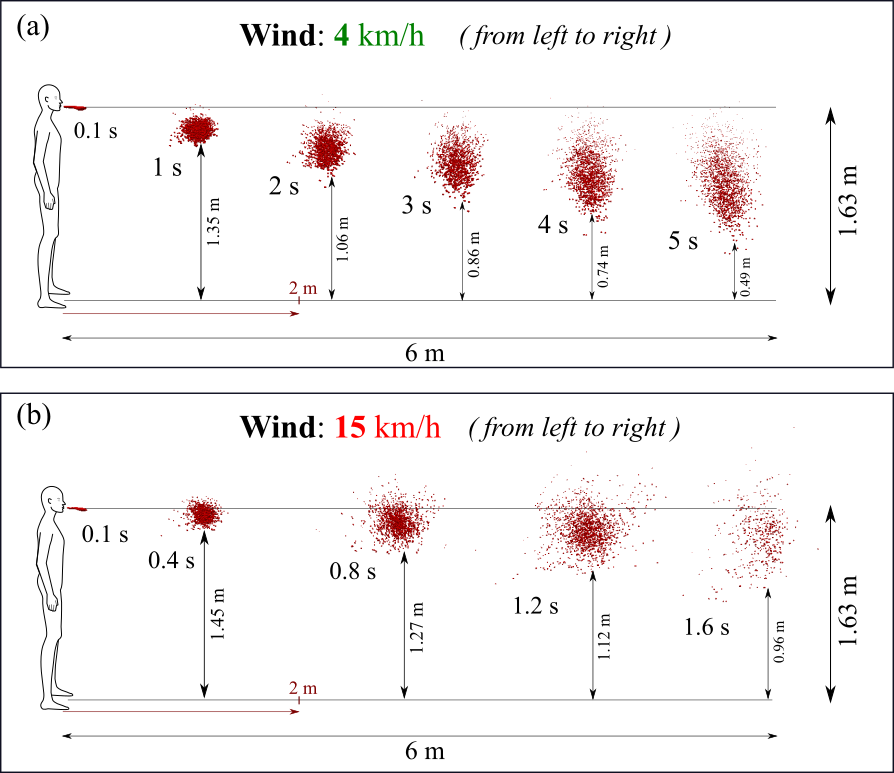
Human cough: effect of wind speed on the transport of respiratory droplets.

Different methods of formation create droplets of different size and initial speed, which affect their transport and fate in the air. As described by the Wells curve, the largest droplets fall sufficiently fast that they usually settle to the ground or another surface before drying out, and droplets smaller than 100 μm will rapidly dry out, before settling on a surface. Once dry, they become solid droplet nuclei consisting of the non-volatile matter initially in the droplet. Respiratory droplets can also interact with other particles of non-biological origin in the air, which are more numerous than them. When people are in close contact, liquid droplets produced by one person may be inhaled by another person; droplets larger than 10 μm tend to remain trapped in the nose and throat while smaller droplets will penetrate to the lower respiratory system.

Advanced computational fluid dynamics (CFD) showed that at wind speeds varying from 4 to 15 km/h, respiratory droplets may travel up to 6 meters.

== Role in disease transmission ==
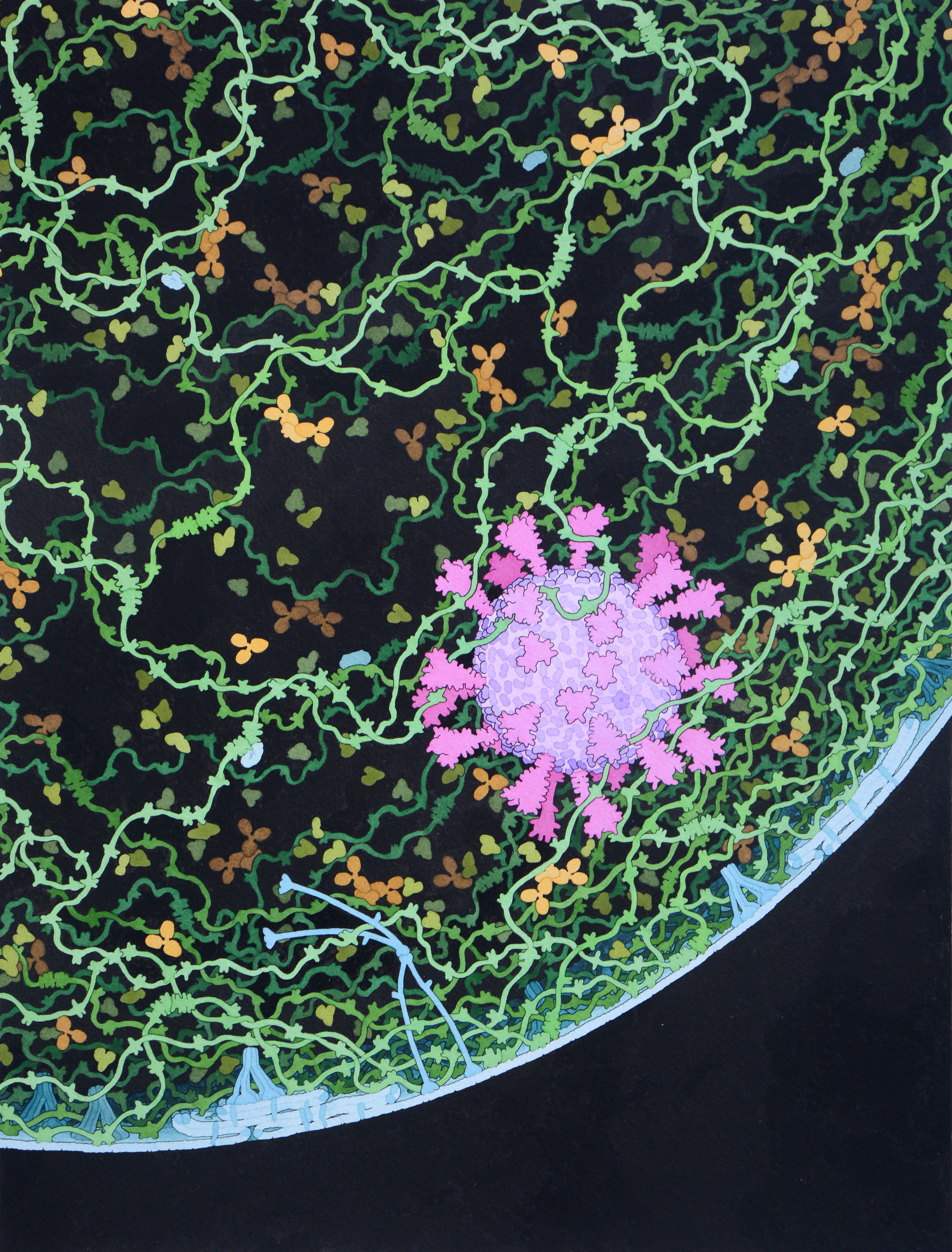
Illustration of a respiratory droplet, showing mucins (green), surfactant proteins and lipids (blue) and a coronavirus particle (pink)

A common form of disease transmission is by way of respiratory droplets, generated by coughing, sneezing, or talking. Respiratory droplet transmission is the usual route for respiratory infections. Transmission can occur when respiratory droplets reach susceptible mucosal surfaces, such as in the eyes, nose, or mouth. This can also happen indirectly via contact with contaminated surfaces when hands then touch the face. Respiratory droplets are large and cannot remain suspended in the air for long, and are usually dispersed over short distances.

Viruses that are spread by droplet transmission include influenza virus, rhinovirus, respiratory syncytial virus, enterovirus, and norovirus; measles morbillivirus; and coronaviruses such as SARS coronavirus (SARS-CoV-1), MERS-CoV, and SARS-CoV-2 that causes COVID-19. Bacterial and fungal infection agents may also be transmitted by respiratory droplets. By contrast, a limited number of diseases can be spread through airborne transmission after the respiratory droplet dries out. We all continuously breathe out these droplets. Some medical procedures called aerosol-generating procedures also generate droplets.

Ambient temperature and humidity affect the survivability of bioaerosols because as the droplet evaporates and becomes smaller, it provides less protection for the infectious agents it may contain. In general, viruses with a lipid viral envelope are more stable in dry air, while those without an envelope are more stable in moist air. Viruses are also generally more stable at low air temperatures.

=== Measures taken to reduce transmission ===
In a healthcare setting, precautions include housing a patient in an individual room, limiting their transport outside the room, and using proper personal protective equipment. It has been noted that during the 2002–2004 SARS outbreak, use of surgical masks and N95 respirators tended to decrease infections of healthcare workers. However, surgical masks are much less good at filtering out small droplets and particles than N95 and similar respirators, so the respirators offer greater protection.

Modern studies have quantified their role in disease spread, particularly during the COVID-19 pandemic, where masks reduced their dispersion by 99%.

Also, higher ventilation rates can be used as a hazard control to dilute and remove respiratory particles. However, if unfiltered or insufficiently filtered air is exhausted to another location, it can lead to spreading of an infection.

== History ==
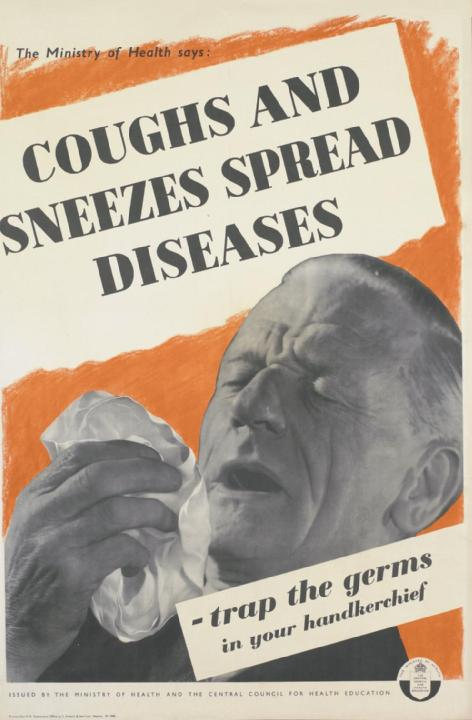
World-War-II-era UK public-health-education poster.

German bacteriologist Carl Flügge in 1899 was the first to show that microorganisms in droplets expelled from the respiratory tract are a means of disease transmission. In the early 20th century, the term Flügge droplet was sometimes used for particles that are large enough to not completely dry out, roughly those larger than 100 μm.

Flügge's concept of droplets as primary source and vector for respiratory transmission of diseases prevailed into the 1930s until William F. Wells differentiated between large and small droplets. He developed the Wells curve, which describes how the size of respiratory droplets influences their fate and thus their ability to transmit disease.

== See also ==
- Basic reproduction number
- Infection prevention and control
- Source control (respiratory disease)
