= William F. Wells =

American sanitation engineer, c.1886 - 1963

William Firth Wells
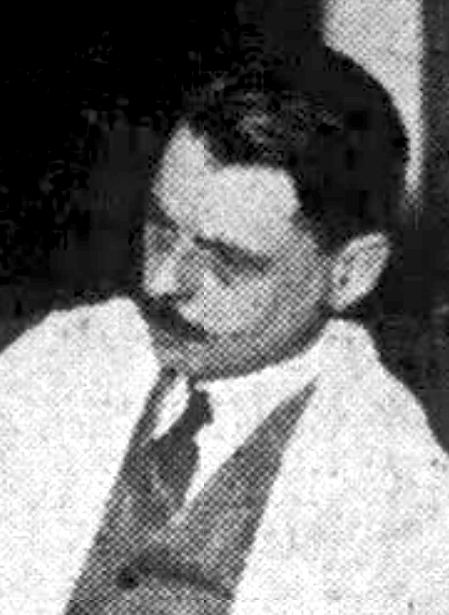
- Born: c. 1886; Boston, Massachusetts, U.S.
- Died: September 8, 1963 (about 75); Baltimore, Maryland, U.S.
- Spouse: Mildred W. Wells

Academic background
- Education: Massachusetts Institute of Technology (1909)

Academic work
- Discipline: Public health
- Sub-discipline: Air sanitation
- Institutions: Harvard School of Public Health; University of Pennsylvania; Johns Hopkins University
- Notable ideas: Airborne transmission of measles and tuberculosis

William Firth Wells (c. 1886 – September 8, 1963) was an American scientist and sanitary engineer. In his early career, he pioneered techniques for the aquaculture of oysters and clams. He is best known for his work on airborne infections. Wells and his wife, Dr. Mildred Weeks Wells, identified that measles and tuberculosis could be transmitted through the air via the nuclei of evaporated respiratory droplets. They developed the Wells curve to describe what happens to respiratory droplets after they have been expelled into the air, and Wells contributed to the Wells-Riley model to predict how the likelihood of infection varies with factors like room ventilation. In 1955, Wells published a major monograph Air Contagion and Air Hygiene synthesizing his lifetime of work on airborne disease transmission. Wells' work experienced a resurgence of interest after 2020, due to its relevance to the COVID-19 pandemic.

== Biography ==
Wells was born c. 1886 in Boston, and had a sister and two brothers. He graduated from the Massachusetts Institute of Technology in 1909. He served in the military during World War I, becoming a captain. In 1917, Wells married Mildred Weeks, a doctor, with whom he had a son. Mildred earned her undergraduate degree from The University of Texas Medical Branch in 1911. She and Wells often co-authored publications on the relationship between disease transmission and indoor ventilation.

Beginning around 1920, Wells was employed by the New York State Conservation Commission as a researcher. Wells lectured at the Harvard School of Public Health in the 1930s but was dismissed following a dispute over academic credit with Gordon Maskew Fair, the Gordon McKay Professor of Sanitary Engineering. Wells was a poor public speaker, which hindered his career. He worked next at the University of Pennsylvania, where he was an associate professor by 1944. In 1954, Wells' career moved to Baltimore, Maryland, where he was a research associate at Johns Hopkins University. He conducted research at the Veterans Administration Hospital, and consulted for the Veterans Administration. During this period, he and his family lived in a remote part of eastern Maryland. One of his colleagues, Richard L. Riley, described him as "an eccentric genius."

Wells was chairman of the American Public Health Association's subcommittee on bacteriologic procedures in air analysis, and chairman of the American Society for Heating and Ventilation Engineers' subcommittee on air sanitation. In 1950, the American Public Health Association honored his 40 years of service.

Well's wife died in 1957. In the late 1950s, Wells collapsed, paralyzed from the waist down. After his initial hospitalization, he was transferred to the VA Hospital in Baltimore where he was overseeing a long-term tuberculosis study. He experienced periods of psychosis but continued to advise on research when lucid. He died on September 9, 1963, at the age of 76.

== Research ==
=== Aquaculture of oysters and clams ===
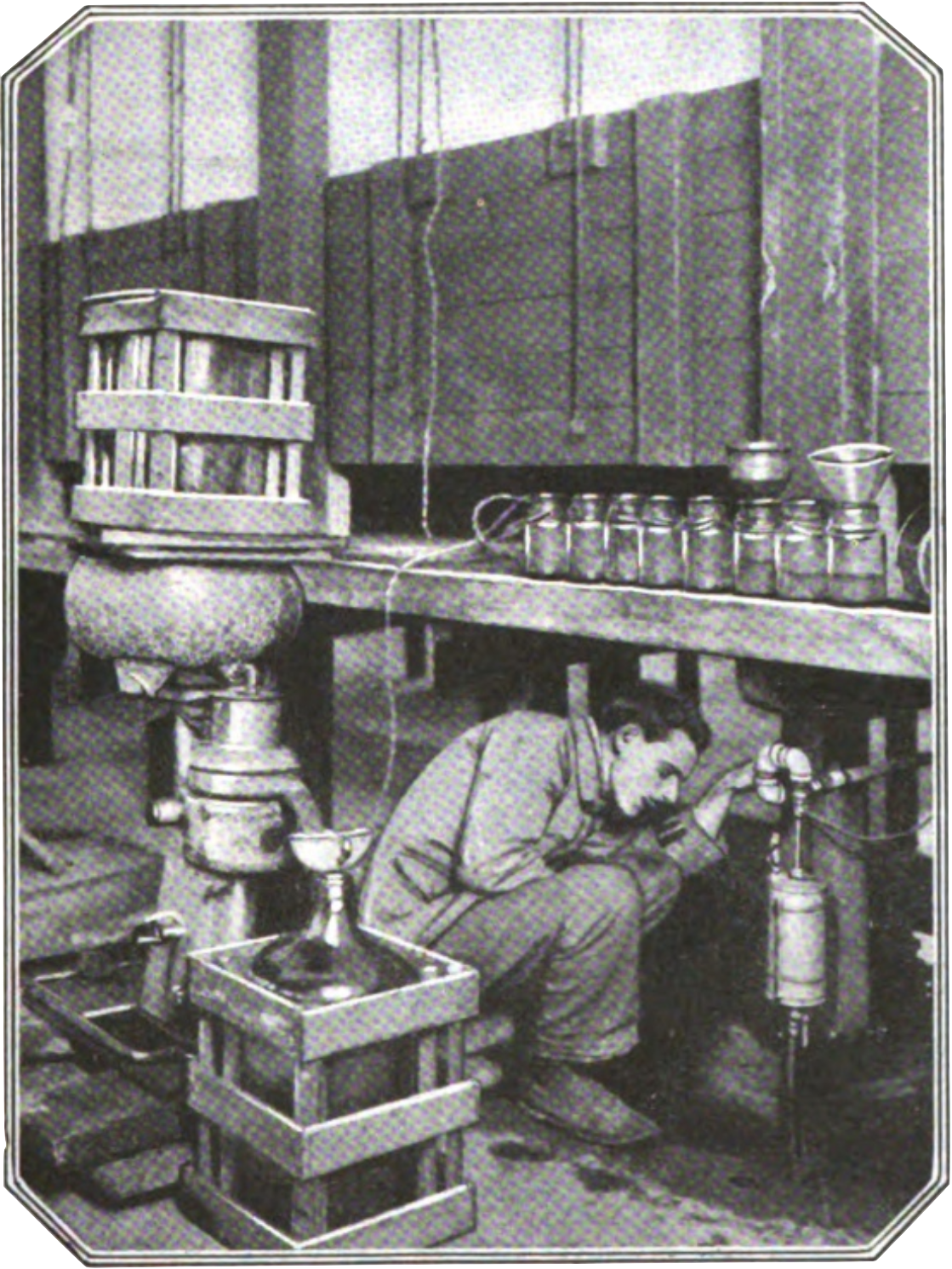
Wells cultivating oysters in 1921; the milk clarifier is the device on the left

Between 1920 and 1926, Wells pioneered aquaculture techniques to culture bivalves. Wells was experimenting with the recently invented De Laval centrifugal milk clarifier, and discovered microscopic oyster larvae in the denser portion of clarified seawater. One previous experimenter, William Keith Brooks, had developed a way to harvest oyster gametes, but the resulting oyster larvae starved to death before they grew large enough to be filtered out of the water. Because the larvae were so small, any attempt to refresh their water supply (which provided their food) would inadvertently remove them. Wells's innovation was to use the clarifier to concentrate the larvae. He used Brooks' method to acquire gametes, and grew them to adulthood in clarified seawater. Wells used the clarifier each day to concentrate the larvae and then replace the separated seawater with fresh water, allowing him to resupply their food without losing them.

With this technique, Wells was the first to successfully cultivate hard clams (Mercenaria mercenaria) in captivity. Wells also cultivated eastern oysters (Crassostrea virginica), blue mussels (Mytilus edulis), soft-shell clams (Mya arenaria), Atlantic surf clams (Spisula solidissima), and Atlantic bay scallops (Argopecten irradians). Other work on oysters included oyster purification with chlorination.

=== Airborne disease transmission ===
Beginning in the 1930s, Wells' research examined respiratory disease transmission, often using a similar centrifugal device to collect and evaluate air samples. His "Wells centrifuge", developed in 1931, became the established tool for bacteriological analysis of air by 1940. He and his wife developed the Wells curve, which describes how the size of respiratory droplets influences their fate and thus their ability to transmit disease. With Richard L. Riley, he also developed the Wells-Riley equation to model factors for disease transmission.

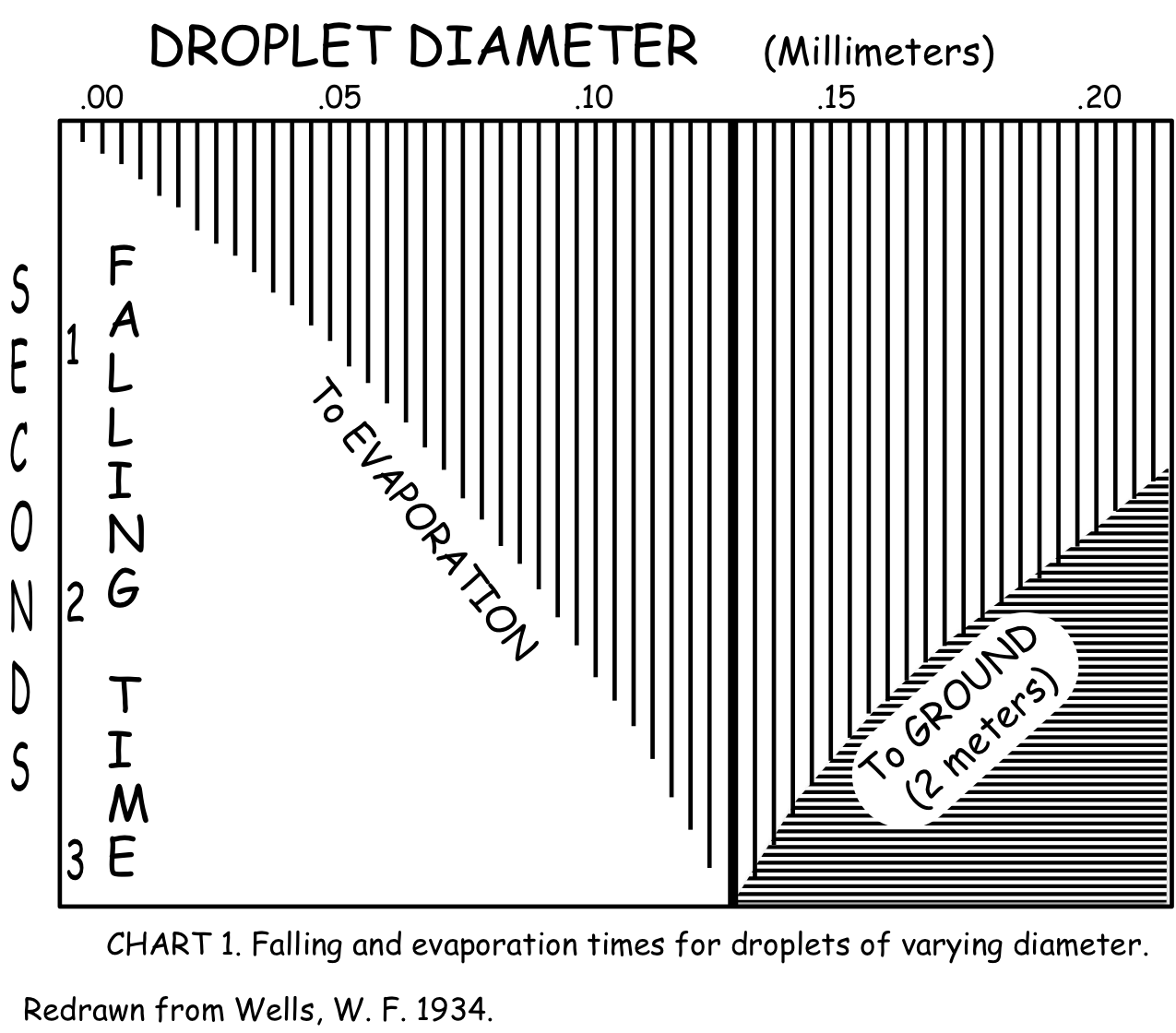
The Wells curve demonstrates that size determines whether respiratory droplets fall to the ground or rapidly dry out and remain airborne after being exhaled.

Wells' major contribution was to show that the nuclei of evaporated respiratory droplets can remain in the air long enough for others to breathe them in and become infected. German bacteriologist Carl Flügge in 1899 was the first to show that microorganisms in droplets expelled from the respiratory tract are a means of disease transmission. The term Flügge droplet was sometimes used for particles that are large enough to not completely dry out. Flügge's concept of droplets as primary source and vector for respiratory transmission of diseases prevailed into the 1930s, when Wells differentiated between large and small droplets, introducing the idea that some infectious droplets could be small enough to remain airborne.

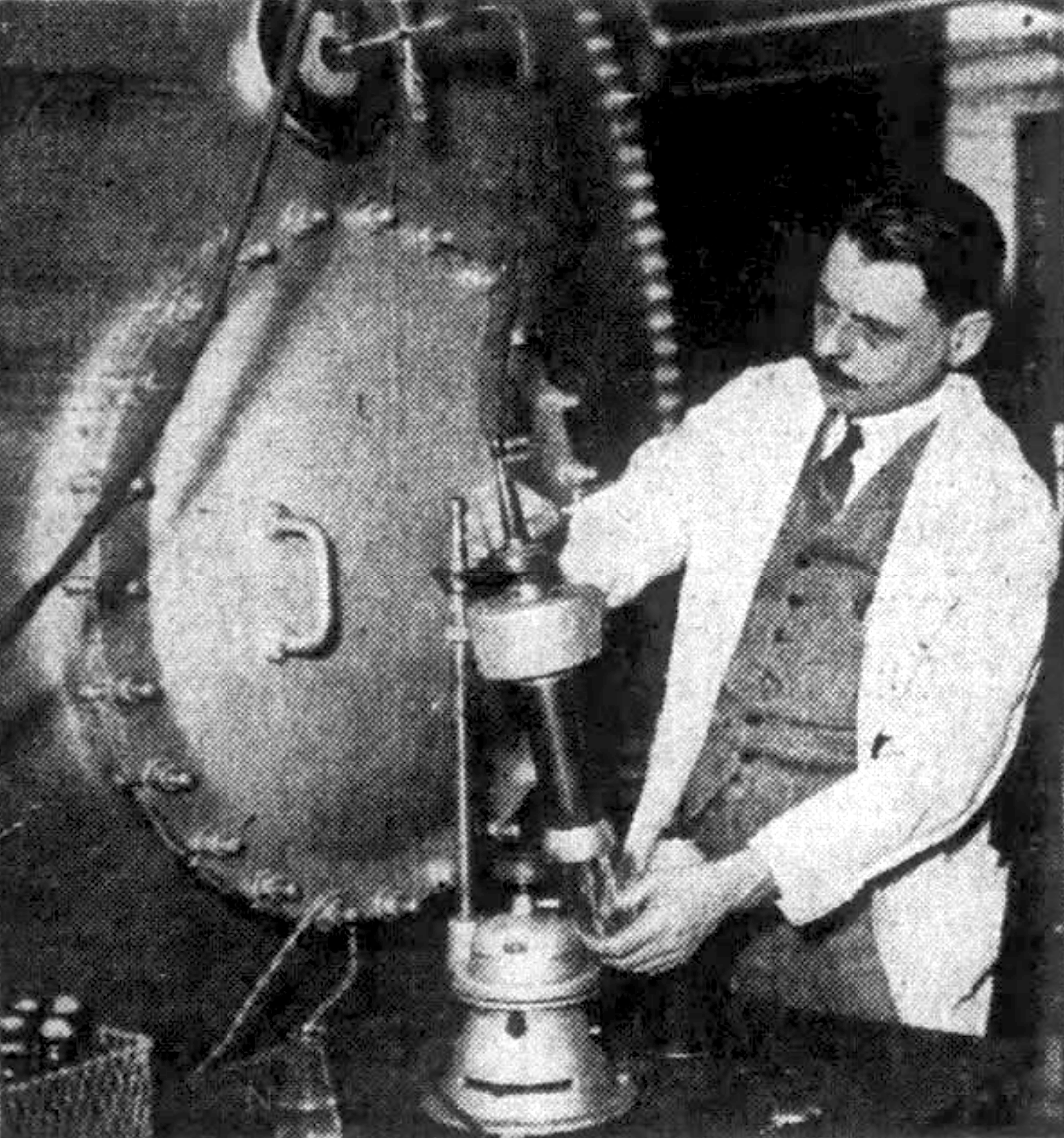
Wells in 1935, taking an air sample from a tank

In 1935, Wells demonstrated that ultraviolet germicidal irradiation (UVGI), which had been used to kill microorganisms on surfaces and in liquids, could also be used to kill airborne infectious organisms. This experiment proved that he had been correct that droplet nuclei could be infectious, and also suggested a route for prevention. In 1935, Wells helped develop UVGI barriers for the Infants' and Children's Hospital in Boston, using cubicle-like rooms subjected to high-intensity UV light to reduce cross-contamination. His next experiment sought to make UVGI more practical by developing upper-room UVGI. This system only sterilized the area above people's heads, allowing the room to be occupied at the time but relying on vertical ventilation to ensure the occupants breathe sterilized air. From 1937 to 1941, Wells implemented a long-term study using upper-room UVGI in suburban Philadelphia schools to prevent the spread of measles. Despite the success of this program, during World War II, Wells and his wife were unsuccessful in convincing the U.S. military to implement their proposed preventative measures against airborne disease transmission. Instead, their research prompted some military exploration of bacterial warfare.

In 1954, Wells began a long-term experiment to demonstrate that tuberculosis could also be transmitted through the air. (Note: Wells had first proposed the idea of airborne droplet nucleus transmission of tuberculosis in the 1930s, and demonstrated that rabbits could be infected with bovine TB through droplets.) He and his collaborators built a chamber at the VA Hospital in Baltimore for 150 guinea pigs to be exposed to air from infectious patients in a nearby TB ward. After two years, they found that an average of three guinea pigs a month were indeed infected. Although this was exactly the rate Wells had predicted, skeptics complained that other methods of transmission (such as the animals' food and water) had not been conclusively ruled out. A second long-term study was begun, this time with a second chamber for an additional 150 guinea pigs, whose air was sterilized with UVGI. The animals in the second room remained healthy, demonstrating conclusively that airborne transmission from the tuberculosis ward was responsible for the infections observed in the first room. The study was completed in 1961 and published in 1962, though Wells did not see the final paper.

=== Legacy and posthumous relevance to COVID-19 pandemic ===
Wells' 1955 book Air Contagion and Air Hygiene, the synthesis of his prior 23 years of research, has been described as the authoritative book on the subject and a "landmark monograph on air hygiene." The science writer Carl Zimmer argues that the research by Wells and his wife was not as influential as it should have been due to Wells' abrasive personality. Wells struggled throughout his career to convince the CDC epidemiologist Alexander Langmuir that diseases could be transmitted through the air. Only Wells' final study (published posthumously in 1962) convinced Langmuir that airborne transmission was a concern for an ongoing tuberculosis epidemic.

In 2021, Wired described a critical over-generalization from Wells' tuberculosis research as "the 60-year-old scientific screwup that helped Covid kill." A major area of scientific inquiry during the COVID-19 pandemic was the disease's method of transmission, and especially the distinction between "droplet" transmission or "airborne" transmission, since different public health measures would be required depending on the transmission vector. A misunderstanding led to the widespread assumption—contrary to Wells' original findings—that only particles smaller than 5 microns could transmit disease.

== Selected publications ==
- "On Air-Borne Infection." American Journal of Epidemiology. 20.3 (November 1934): 611–618.
- Airborne Contagion and Air Hygiene: An Ecological Study of Droplet Infections. Cambridge (MA): Harvard University Press; 1955.
