= Airborne transmission =

Disease transmission by airborne particles

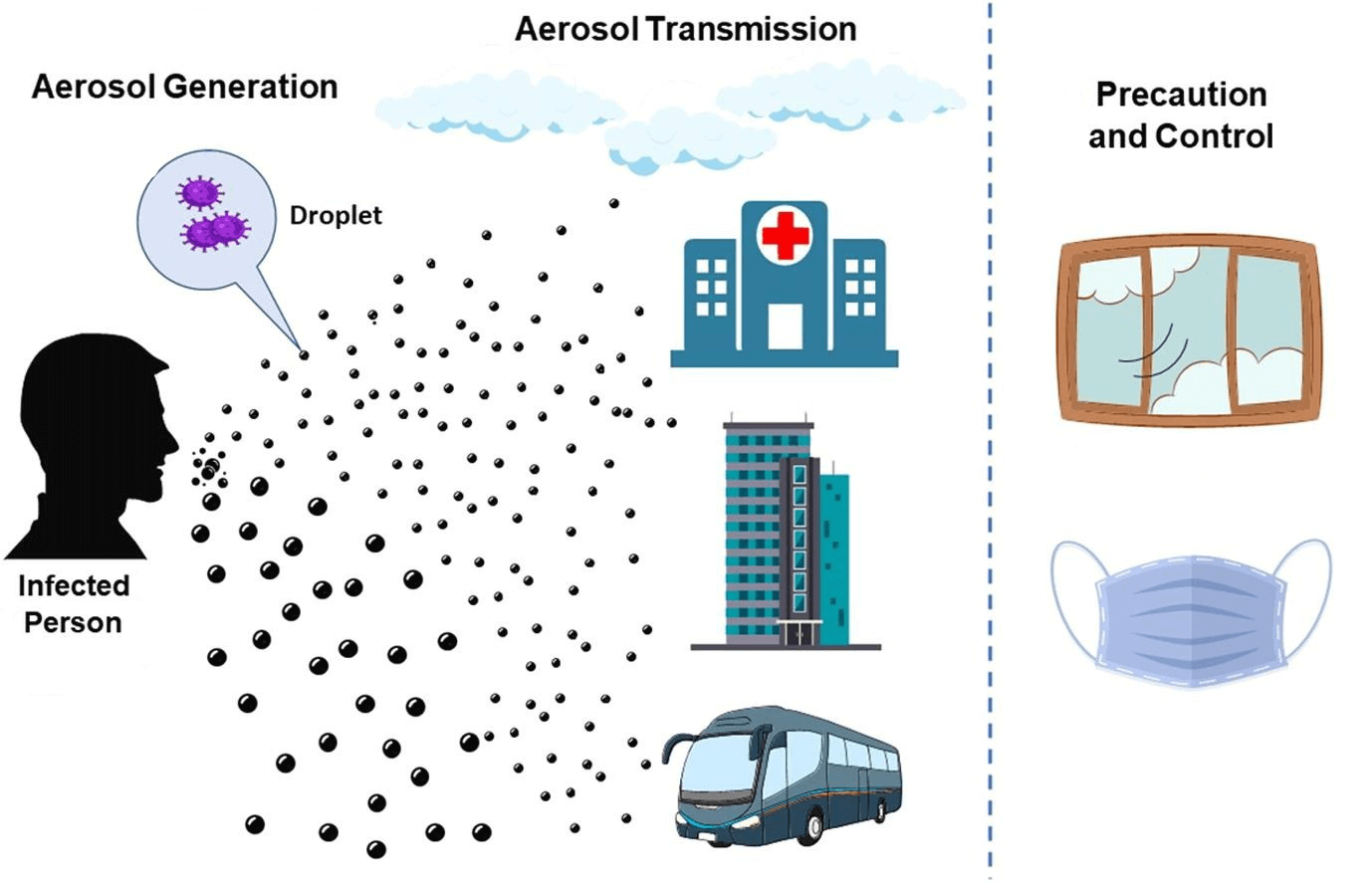
Infected people generate larger droplets and aerosols which can infect over longer distances

A poster outlining precautions for airborne transmission in healthcare settings. It is intended to be posted outside rooms of patients with an infection that can spread through airborne transmission.

Video explainer on reducing airborne pathogen transmission indoors

Airborne transmission or aerosol transmission is transmission of an infectious disease through small particles suspended in the air. Infectious diseases capable of airborne transmission include many of considerable importance both in human and veterinary medicine. The relevant infectious agent may be viruses, bacteria, or fungi, and they may be spread through breathing, talking, coughing, sneezing, raising of dust, spraying of liquids, flushing toilets, or any activities which generate aerosol particles or droplets.

== Infectious aerosols: physical terminology ==
Aerosol transmission has traditionally been considered distinct from transmission by droplets, but this distinction is no longer used. Respiratory droplets were thought to rapidly fall to the ground after emission: but smaller droplets and aerosols also contain live infectious agents, and can remain in the air longer and travel farther. Individuals generate aerosols and droplets across a wide range of sizes and concentrations, and the amount produced varies widely by person and activity. Larger droplets greater than 100 μm usually settle within 2 m. Smaller particles can carry airborne pathogens for extended periods of time. While the concentration of airborne pathogens is greater within 2 m, they can travel farther and concentrate in a room.

The traditional size cutoff of 5 μm between airborne and respiratory droplets has been discarded, as exhaled particles form a continuum of sizes whose fates depend on environmental conditions in addition to their initial sizes. This error has informed hospital based transmission based precautions for decades. Indoor respiratory secretion transfer data suggest that droplets/aerosols in the 20 μm size range initially travel with the air flow from cough jets and air conditioning like aerosols, but fall out gravitationally at a greater distance as "jet riders". As this size range is most efficiently filtered out in the nasal mucosa, the primordial infection site in COVID-19, aerosols/droplets in this size range may have contributed to driving the COVID-19 pandemic.

== Overview ==
Airborne diseases can be transmitted from one individual to another through the air. The pathogens transmitted may be any kind of microbe, and they may be spread in aerosols, dust or droplets. The aerosols might be generated from sources of infection such as the bodily secretions of an infected individual, or biological wastes. Infectious aerosols may stay suspended in air currents long enough to travel for considerable distances; sneezes, for example, can easily project infectious droplets for dozens of feet (ten or more meters).

Airborne pathogens or allergens typically enter the body via the nose, throat, sinuses and lungs. Inhalation of these pathogens affects the respiratory system and can then spread to the rest of the body. Sinus congestion, coughing and sore throats are examples of inflammation of the upper respiratory airway. Air pollution plays a significant role in airborne diseases. Pollutants can influence lung function by increasing air way inflammation.

Common infections that spread by airborne transmission include SARS-CoV-2; measles morbillivirus, chickenpox virus; Mycobacterium tuberculosis, influenza virus, enterovirus, norovirus and less commonly other species of coronavirus, adenovirus, and possibly respiratory syncytial virus. Some pathogens which have more than one mode of transmission are also anisotropic, meaning that their different modes of transmission can cause different kinds of diseases, with different levels of severity. Two examples are the bacteria Yersinia pestis (which causes plague) and Francisella tularensis (which causes tularaemia), which both can cause severe pneumonia, if transmitted via the airborne route through inhalation.

Poor ventilation enhances transmission by allowing aerosols to spread undisturbed in an indoor space. Crowded rooms are more likely to contain an infected person. The longer a susceptible person stays in such a space, the greater chance of transmission. Airborne transmission is complex, and hard to demonstrate unequivocally but the Wells-Riley model can be used to make simple estimates of infection probability.

Some airborne diseases can affect non-humans. For example, Newcastle disease is an avian disease that affects many types of domestic poultry worldwide that is airborne.

It has been suggested that airborne transmission should be classified as being either obligate, preferential, or opportunistic, although there is limited research that show the importance of each of these categories. Obligate airborne infections spread only through aerosols; the most common example of this category is tuberculosis. Preferential airborne infections, such as chicken pox, can be obtained through different routes, but mainly by aerosols. Opportunistic airborne infections such as influenza typically transmit through other routes; however, under favourable conditions, aerosol transmission can occur.

== Transmission efficiency ==
Environmental factors influence the efficacy of airborne disease transmission; the most evident environmental conditions are temperature and relative humidity. The transmission of airborne diseases is affected by all the factors that influence temperature and humidity, in both meteorological (outdoor) and human (indoor) environments. Circumstances influencing the spread of droplets containing infectious particles can include pH, salinity, wind, air pollution, and solar radiation as well as human behavior.

Airborne infections usually land in the respiratory system, with the agent present in aerosols (infectious particles < 5 μm in diameter). This includes dry particles, often the remnant of an evaporated wet particle called nuclei, and wet particles.

- Relative humidity (RH) plays an important role in the evaporation of droplets and the distance they travel. 30 μm droplets evaporate in seconds. The CDC recommends a minimum of 40% RH indoors to significantly reduce the infectivity of aerosolized virus. An ideal humidity for preventing aerosol respiratory viral transmission at room temperature appears to be between 40% and 60% RH. If the relative humidity goes below 35% RH, infectious virus stays longer in the air.
- The number of rainy days (more important than total precipitation); mean daily sunshine hours; latitude and altitude are relevant when assessing the possibility of spread of airborne disease. Some infrequent or exceptional events influence the dissemination of airborne diseases, including tropical storms, hurricanes, typhoons, or monsoons.
- Climate affects temperature, winds and relative humidity, the main factors affecting the spread, duration and infectiousness of droplets containing infectious particles. The influenza virus spreads easily in the Northern Hemisphere winter due to climate conditions that favour the infectiousness of the virus.
- Isolated weather events decrease the concentration of airborne fungal spores; a few days later, number of spores increases exponentially.
- Socioeconomics has a minor role in airborne disease transmission. In cities, airborne disease spreads more rapidly than in rural areas and urban outskirts. Rural areas generally favor higher airborne fungal dissemination.
- Proximity to large bodies of water such as rivers and lakes can enhance airborne disease.
- A direct association between insufficient ventilation rates and increased COVID-19 transmission has been observed. Prior to COVID-19, standards for ventilation systems focused more on supplying sufficient oxygen to a room, rather than disease-related aspects of air quality.
- Poor maintenance of air conditioning systems has led to outbreaks of Legionella pneumophila.
- Hospital-acquired airborne diseases are associated with poorly-resourced and maintained medical systems.
- Air conditioning may reduce transmission by removing contaminated air, but may also contribute to the spread of respiratory secretions inside a room.
- The new findings reveal that understanding airflow patterns is even more crucial than simply increasing air changes per hour. During the COVID-19 pandemic, the common advice was to maximize ventilation, but this may not always be the most effective approach. A room can be well-prepared to prevent the spread of infectious diseases even at a low ACH. This insight could lead to safer building designs and significant energy savings during future pandemics.

== Prevention ==
A layered risk-management approach to slowing the spread of a transmissible disease attempts to minimize risk through multiple layers of interventions. Each intervention has the potential to reduce risk. A layered approach can include interventions by individuals (e.g. mask wearing, hand hygiene), institutions (e.g. surface disinfection, ventilation, and air filtration measures to control the indoor environment), the medical system (e.g. vaccination) and public health at the population level (e.g. testing, quarantine, and contact tracing).

Preventive techniques can include disease-specific immunization as well as nonpharmaceutical interventions such as wearing a respirator and limiting time spent in the presence of infected individuals. Wearing a face mask can lower the risk of airborne transmission to the extent that it limits the transfer of airborne particles between individuals. The type of mask that is effective against airborne transmission is dependent on the size of the particles. While fluid-resistant surgical masks prevent large droplet inhalation, smaller particles which form aerosols require a higher level of protection with filtration masks rated at N95 (US) or FFP3 (EU) required. Use of FFP3 masks by staff managing patients with COVID-19 reduced acquisition of COVID-19 by staff members.

Engineering solutions which aim to control or eliminate exposure to a hazard are higher on the hierarchy of control than personal protective equipment (PPE). At the level of physically based engineering interventions, effective ventilation and high frequency air changes, or air filtration through high efficiency particulate filters, reduce detectable levels of virus and other bioaerosols, improving conditions for everyone in an area. Portable air filters, such as those tested in Conway Morris A et al. present a readily deployable solution when existing ventilation is inadequate, for instance in repurposed COVID-19 hospital facilities.

The United States Centers for Disease Control and Prevention (CDC) advises the public about vaccination and following careful hygiene and sanitation protocols for airborne disease prevention. Many public health specialists recommend physical distancing (also known as social distancing) to reduce transmission.

A 2011 study concluded that vuvuzelas (a type of air horn popular e.g. with fans at football games) presented a particularly high risk of airborne transmission, as they were spreading a much higher number of aerosol particles than e.g., the act of shouting.

Exposure does not guarantee infection. The generation of aerosols, adequate transport of aerosols through the air, inhalation by a susceptible host, and deposition in the respiratory tract are all important factors contributing to the over-all risk for infection. Furthermore, the infective ability of the virus must be maintained throughout all these stages. In addition the risk for infection is also dependent on host immune system competency plus the quantity of infectious particles ingested. Antibiotics may be used in dealing with airborne bacterial primary infections, such as pneumonic plague and whooping cough.

== See also ==
- Aeroplankton
- Basic reproduction number
- Miasma theory
- Vector (epidemiology)
- Waterborne diseases
- Zoonosis
