= Fomite =

Non-living object capable of carrying infectious agents

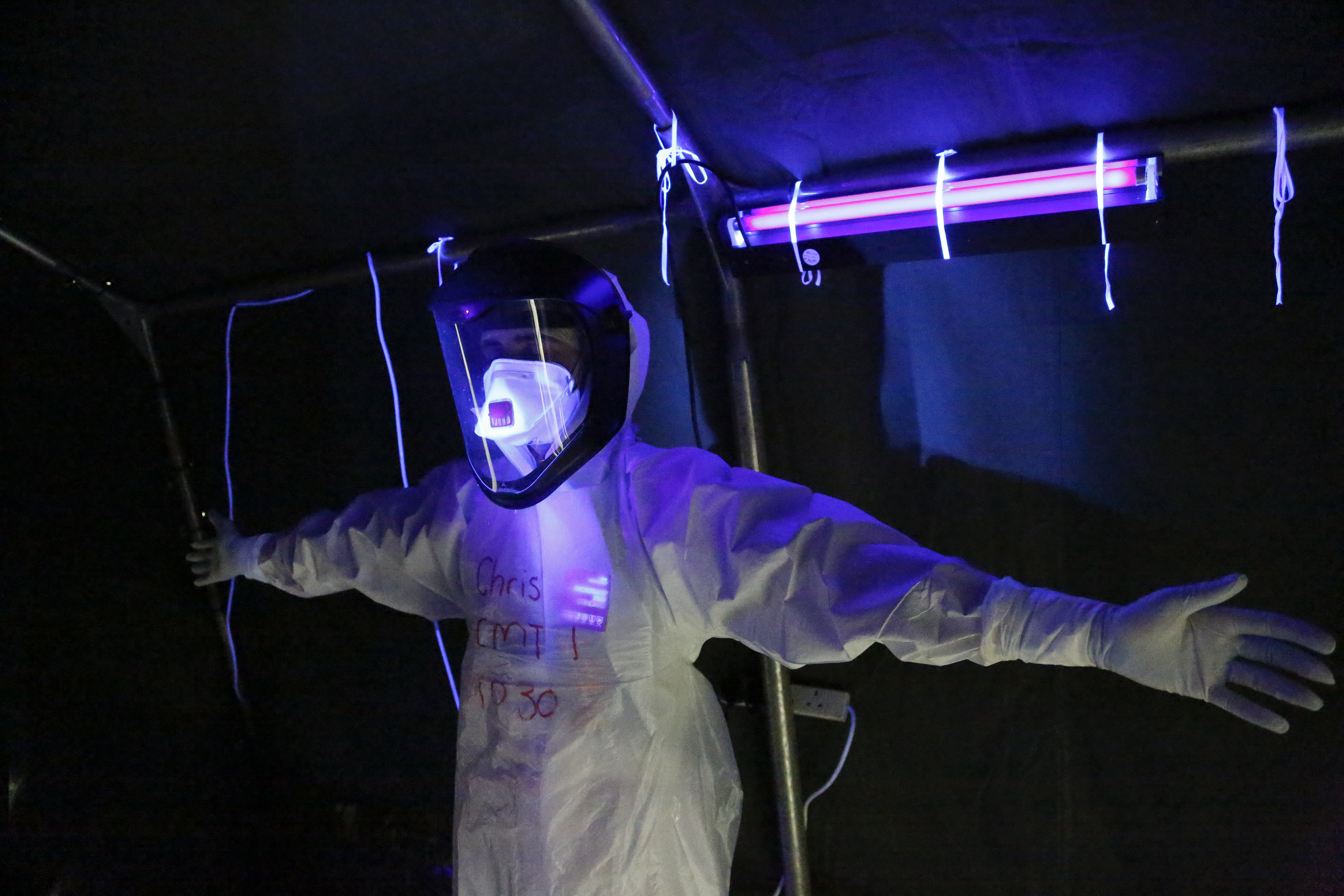
Detecting whether medics have inadvertently transferred fluids to their clothing during a training sequence using simulated bodily fluids carrying a fluorescent dye

A fomite (/ˈfoʊmaɪt/) or fomes (/ˈfoʊmiːz/) is any inanimate object that, when contaminated with or exposed to infectious agents (such as pathogenic bacteria, viruses or fungi), can transfer disease to a new host.

== Transfer of pathogens by fomites ==
A fomite is any inanimate object (also called passive vector) that, when contaminated with or exposed to infectious agents (such as pathogenic bacteria, viruses or fungi), can transfer disease to a new host. Contamination can occur when one of these objects comes into contact with bodily secretions, like nasal fluid, vomit or feces from toilet plume. Many common objects can sustain a pathogen until a person comes in contact with the pathogen, increasing the chance of infection. The likely objects are different in a hospital environment than at home or in a workplace. Fomites such as splinters, barbed wire or farmyard surfaces, including soil, feeding troughs or barn beams, have been implicated as sources of virus.

=== Hospital fomites ===
For humans, common hospital fomites are skin cells, hair, clothing, and bedding.

Fomites are associated particularly with hospital-acquired infections (HAIs), as they are possible routes to pass pathogens between patients. Stethoscopes and neckties are common fomites associated with health care providers. It worries epidemiologists and hospital practitioners because of the growing selection of microbes resistant to disinfectants or antibiotics (so-called antimicrobial resistance phenomenon).

Basic hospital equipment, such as IV drip tubes, catheters, and life support equipment, can also be carriers, when the pathogens form biofilms on the surfaces. Careful sterilization of such objects prevents cross-infection. Used syringes, if improperly handled, are particularly dangerous fomites.

=== Daily life ===
In addition to objects in hospital settings, other common fomites for humans are cups, spoons, pencils, bath faucet handles, toilet flush levers, door knobs, light switches, handrails, elevator buttons, television remote controls, pens, touch screens, common-use phones, keyboards and computer mice, coffeepot handles, countertops, drinking fountains, and any other items that may be frequently touched by different people and infrequently cleaned.

Cold sores, hand–foot–mouth disease, and diarrhea are some examples of illnesses easily spread by contaminated fomites. The risk of infection by these diseases and others through fomites can be greatly reduced by simply washing one's hands. When two children in one household have influenza, more than 50% of shared items are contaminated with virus. In 40–90% cases, adults infected with rhinovirus have it on their hands.

=== Transmission in fitness environments ===
Fitness centers and gymnasiums are increasingly recognized as environments that may facilitate fomite-mediated transmission due to shared equipment, high-touch surfaces, and frequent human contact. Items such as free weights, exercise machines, yoga mats, and locker room surfaces can serve as reservoirs for microorganisms if not adequately disinfected.

Pathogens including methicillin-resistant Staphylococcus aureus (MRSA), dermatophyte fungi, and certain viruses have been associated with transmission in athletic and fitness settings. Transmission may occur when individuals come into contact with contaminated surfaces and subsequently touch their skin, mucous membranes, or open wounds.

In fitness environments, recommended measures include regular disinfection of shared equipment, proper hand hygiene, use of personal barriers such as towels, and improved ventilation to reduce microbial persistence on surfaces and in the air.

=== Transmission of specific viruses ===
Researchers have discovered that smooth (non-porous) surfaces like door knobs transmit bacteria and viruses better than porous materials like paper money because porous, especially fibrous, materials absorb and trap the contagion, making it harder to contract through simple touch. Nonetheless, fomites may include soiled clothes, towels, linens, handkerchiefs, and surgical dressings.

SARS-CoV-2 was found to be viable on various surfaces from 4 to 72 hours under laboratory conditions. On porous surfaces, studies report inability to detect viable virus within minutes to hours; on non-porous surfaces, viable virus can be detected for days to weeks. However, further research called into question the relevance of such tests, instead finding fomite transmission of SARS-Cov-2 in real world settings is extremely rare when standard cleaning procedures are followed.

Contact with aerosolized virus (large droplet spread) generated via talking, sneezing, coughing, or vomiting, toilet flushing & produced toilet plume or contact with airborne virus that settles after disturbance of a contaminated fomite (e.g. shaking a contaminated blanket). During the first 24 hours, the risk can be reduced by increasing ventilation and waiting as long as possible before entering the space (at least several hours, based on documented airborne transmission cases), and using personal protective equipment (including any protection needed for the cleaning and disinfection products) to reduce risk.

The 2007 research showed that the influenza virus was still active on stainless steel 24 hours after contamination. Though on hands it survives only for five minutes, the constant contact with a fomite almost certainly means catching the infection. Transfer efficiency depends not only on surface, but mainly on pathogen type. For example, avian influenza survives on both porous and non-porous materials for 144 hours.

Smallpox was long supposed to be transmitted either by direct contact or by fomites. However A. R. Rao’s careful researches in the 1960s, before smallpox was declared extinct, found little truth in the traditional belief that smallpox can be spread at a distance through infected clothing or bedding. He concluded that it normally invaded via the lungs. Rao recognized that the virus can be detected on inanimate objects, and therefore might in some cases be transmitted by them, but he concluded that “smallpox is still an inhalation disease ... the virus has to enter through the nose by inhalation".

In 2002 Donald K. Milton published a review of existing research upon the transmission of smallpox and upon recommendations for controlling its spread in the event of its use in biological war. He agreed, citing Rao, Fenner and others, that “careful epidemiologic investigation rarely implicated fomites as a source of infection”; and broadly agreed with current recommendations for control of secondary smallpox infections, which emphasized transmission via “expelled droplets” upon the breath. He noted that shed scabs (which might be spread via bedsheets or other fomites) often contain “large quantities of virus”, but suggested that the “apparent lack of infectiousness of scab associated virus” might be due to “encapsulation with inspissated pus”.

Contaminated needles are the most common fomite that transmits HIV. Fomites from dirty needles also easily spread Hepatitis B.

== Etymology ==
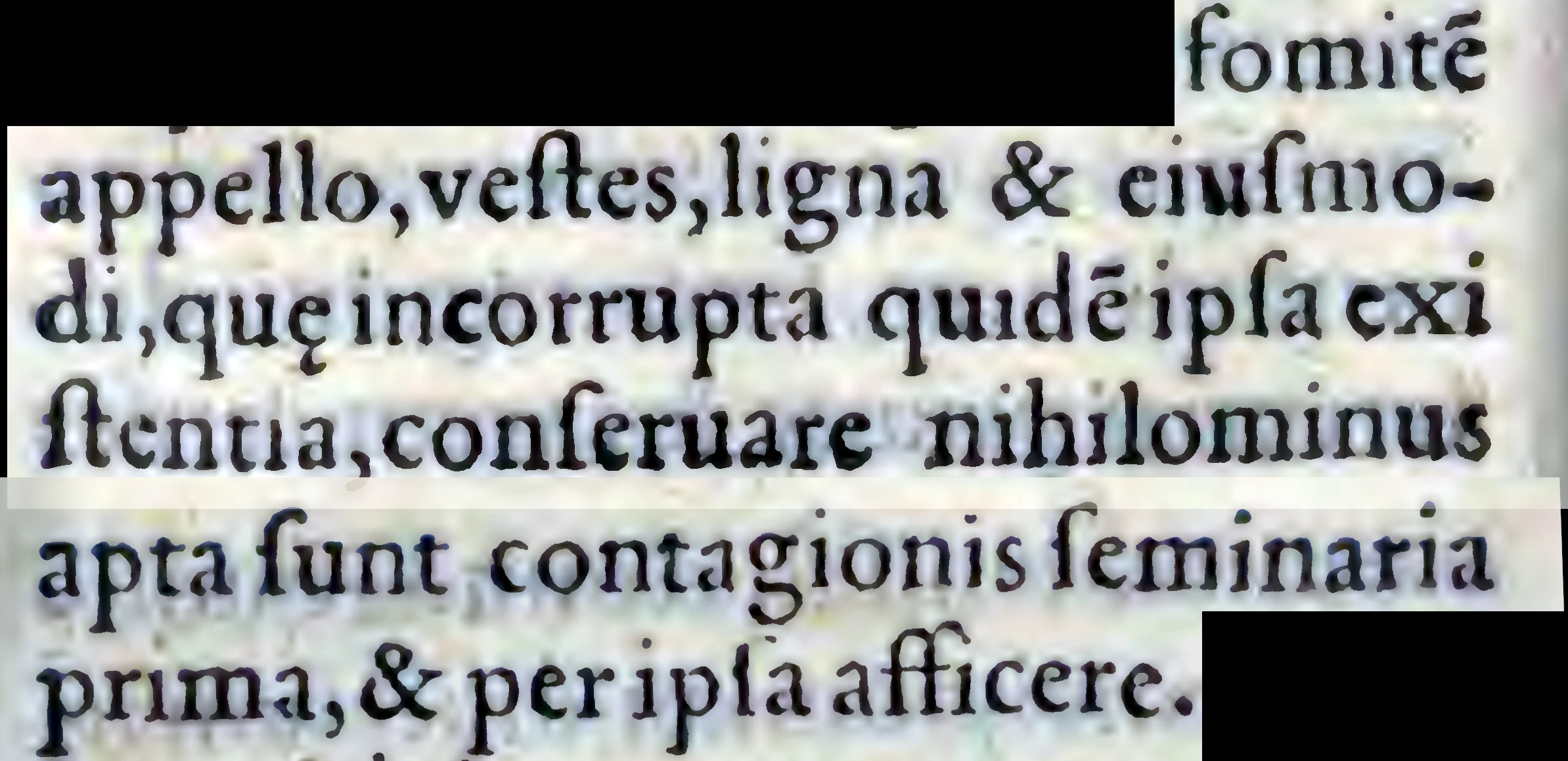

The Italian scholar and physician Girolamo Fracastoro appears to have first used the Latin word fomes, meaning "tinder", in this sense in his essay on contagion, De Contagione et Contagiosis Morbis, published in 1546: "By fomes I mean clothes, wooden objects, and things of that sort, which though not themselves corrupted can, nevertheless, preserve the original germs of the contagion and infect by means of these".

English usage of fomes, pronounced /ˈfoʊmiːz/, is documented since 1658. The English word fomite, which has been in use since 1859, is a back-formation from the plural fomites (originally borrowed from the Latin plural fōmĭtēs [ˈfoːmɪteːs] of fōmĕs [ˈfoːmɛs]). Over time, the English-language pronunciation of the plural fomites changed from /ˈfoʊmɪtiːz/) to /ˈfoʊmaɪts/, which led to the creation of a new singular fomite, pronounced /ˈfoʊmaɪt/.

In Latin, fomes (genitive: fomitis, plural fomites, stem fomit-) is a third-declension T-stem noun. Such nouns, like miles/militis or comes/comitis, typically lose their T (thereby becoming a syllable shorter) in the nominative singular, but retain it in all other cases. In languages derived from Latin, the French fomite, Italian fomite, Spanish fómite and Portuguese fómite or fômite, retain the full stem.

== See also ==
- Focal infection theory
- Focus of infection
- Disease vector

== Bibliography ==
- Cook, Nigel (2013), "10.1 Introduction; the role of fomites in the virus transmission", Viruses in Food and Water: Risks, Surveillance and Control, Cambridge: Woodhead Publishing, pp. 205–215, ISBN 978-0-85709-887-0
- Bennett, John V.; Jarvis, William Robert; Brachman, Philip S. (2007), "Chapter 19: The Inanimate Environment", Bennett & Brachman's Hospital Infections, Philadelphia: Lippincott Williams & Wilkins, p. 277, ISBN 978-0-7817-6383-7
- Fortuine, Robert (2000), The Words of Medicine: Sources, Meanings, and Delights, Springfield: Charles C Thomas Publisher, p. 53, ISBN 0398071322
- Larson, Elaine L.; Liverman, Catharyn T. (2011), "Understanding the Risk to Healthcare Personnel: Fomite Persistence", Preventing Transmission of Pandemic Influenza and Other Viral Respiratory Diseases: Personal Protective Equipment for Healthcare Personnel: Update 2010, Washington: National Academies Press, p. 41, ISBN 978-0-309-16254-8
- Shors, Teri (2017), "Clinical Signs and Symptoms of Human Herpersviruses", Understanding Viruses, Wisconsin: Jones & Bartlett Learning, ISBN 978-1-284-02592-7
