= Muehrcke's nails =

Muehrcke's lines
- Other names: Apparent leukonychia striata
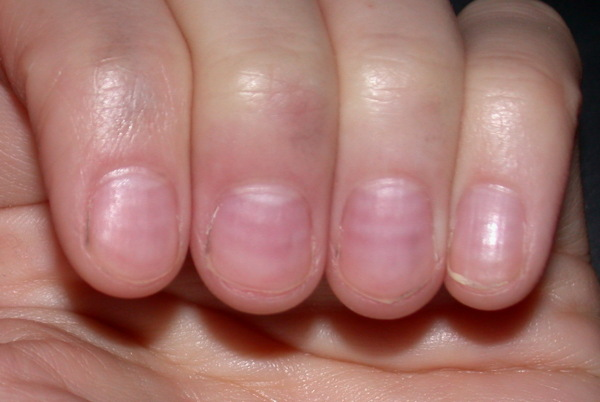

Muehrcke's nails or Muehrcke's lines (apparent leukonychia striata) are changes in the fingernail that may be a sign of an underlying medical condition. The term refers to a set of one or more pale transverse bands extending all the way across the nail, parallel to the lunula. In contrast to Beau's lines, they are not grooved (no 3-dimensional deformity), and in contrast to Mees' lines, the thumb is usually not involved.

Muehrcke's lines are a strong indicator of hypoalbuminemia, which can result from a variety of different causes.

The lines are actually in the vascular bed underneath the nail plate. As such, they do not move with nail growth, and disappear when pressure is applied to the nail (blanching the underlying nail bed): this distinguishes them from "true leukonychia striata" such as Mees' lines. As in Terry's and half-and-half nails, the pattern is thought to be formed by bands of localized edema exerting pressure on the surrounding capillaries.

== Physiology ==
The appearance of Muehrcke's lines is associated specifically with marked hypoalbuminemia (serum albumin ≤ 2.2 g/dL) indicating decreased protein synthesis, which may occur during periods of metabolic stress (e.g. systemic infection, trauma, AIDS, chemotherapy), or in hypoalbuminemic states such as the nephrotic syndrome or dietary protein deficiency. They are also seen in people with end-stage kidney disease on hemodialysis, Hodgkin's disease, pellagra, and sickle cell anaemia.

The lines remain visible as long as protein intake is inadequate or synthesis is impaired, and they should disappear upon return to normal function.

In extreme conditions, Muehrcke's lines may also arise from physical changes in peripheral circulation: one case study reported appearance of the lines in a healthy subject following ascent to 8,848 meters (29,029 ft) on Mount Everest.

== History ==
Muehrcke's lines were described by American physician Robert C. Muehrcke (1921–2003) in 1956. In a study published in BMJ, he examined patients with known chronic hypoalbuminemia and healthy volunteers, finding that the appearance of multiple transverse white lines was a highly specific marker for low serum albumin (no subject with the sign had SA over 2.2 g/dL), was associated with severity of the underlying condition, and disappeared upon successful treatment (corticosteroids in nephrotic syndrome) or direct infusion of HSA.

== See also ==
- Mees' lines – a similar appearance, except the lines are in the nail and move as the nail grows
- Half and half nails
- Terry's nails
- List of cutaneous conditions

== Bibliography ==
- Fawcett, Robert S.; Sean Linford; Daniel L. Stulberg (March 15, 2004). "Nail Abnormalities: Clues to Systemic Disease". American Family Physician. 69 (6): 1417–24. PMID 15053406.
- James, William; Berger, Timothy; Elston, Dirk (2005). Andrews' Diseases of the Skin: Clinical Dermatology. (10th ed.). Saunders. ISBN 0-7216-2921-0.
- Muehrcke Lines of the Fingernails at eMedicine
- Muehrcke's Lines of the Fingernails on WebMD
