= 1997 Sarawak HFMD outbreak =

Disease outbreak in Malaysia

- Disease: Enterovirus 71
- Index case: April 1997
- Confirmed cases: 600
- Deaths: 28–31

The 1997 Sarawak HFMD outbreak is a hand, foot, and mouth disease (HFMD) outbreak from April until June caused by the Enterovirus 71 (EV-71) affecting 600 children in the state of Sarawak in Malaysia. Sarawak is the first state in Malaysia that reported HFMD outbreak. An estimated 28 to 31 of the infected children died as a result. The affected children are aged between five months to six years.

== Background ==
No data was available for HFMD or EV-71 in Malaysia before the 1997 outbreak. In the midst of the outbreak in Sarawak, Coxsackie B virus (CV-B) was initially thought to be the causative agent based on the clinical presentation of myocarditis, but not detected among the deceased children. Instead, EV-71 was isolated from these fatal cases. After a few months, Enterovirus-71 was isolated from deceased children in Peninsular Malaysia that died from brainstem encephalomyelitis.

== Epidemiology ==
Generally, HFMD disease symptoms can range from asymptomatic to symptoms associated with the upper respiratory tract, gastrointestinal tract, central nervous system, and cardiovascular system. Up to 71% of EV-71 infections are asymptomatic.

EV-71 infection can be divided into four stages. Stage 1 of EV-71 infection is uncomplicated and can manifest as HFMD or herpangina. Other types of viruses such as Coxsackievirus A4, A5, A10, B2, and B5 can also cause HFMD. Incubation period (period of time from exposure of the virus to the appearance of symptoms) ranges from three to seven days. An infected person can spread the disease several days before the symptoms appear and peak one week after the onset of the disease. Common symptoms at this stage are fever, sore throat, exanthem (especially maculopapular rash) at palms, feet, and buttocks. The disease can also affect the oral cavity, causing vesicles (small blisters) and ulcers on the tongue and soft palate. If only the oral cavity is affected, without the involvement of other body parts, it is known as herpangina. Most HFMD and herpangina are mild diseases and will resolve by themselves. Stage 2 of the disease occurs a few days after stage I, and can be caused by EV-71 or echoviruses. Stage 2 is characterised by central nervous system involvement, causing meningoencephalitis, and polio-like syndrome such as poliomyelitis-like paralysis, and non-paralytic poliomyelitis (aseptic meningitis). EV-71 subgenotypes C1 and B5 are more likely to cause central nervous system infection when compared to subgenotype B4. Meningoencephalitis is the most common manifestation of the disease, while poliomyelitis-like paralysis is the least common. Stage 3 of the disease signifies involvement of the heart and lungs. Stage 4 of the disease signifies long-term neurological consequences after the child recovered from the illness.

Once infected with Cosackie A virus, it provides immunity against repeated infection with other serotypes of Cosackcie A viruses. However, Cosackie A virus infection does not provide immunity against EV-71 virus infection. Questions remain about whether an EV-71 virus infection provides immunity against other serotypes of EV-71 virus infection.

Swabs done on skin vesicle, ulcer, oral, thorat, rectal, stool, and cerebrospinal fluid have shown EV-71 and Cosackie A16 was the most frequent isolated viruses isolated in Sarawak.

In Sarawak, the most frequent symptoms of a child with central nervous system involvement are fever more than 38 degree Celsius for more than 3 days and lethargy.

Through autopsies performed on the deceased children, their deaths are caused by several symptoms linked to the disease such as poor peripheral perfusion, tachycardia and cardiac failures with earlier developed symptoms such as shock, pallor, cold extremities, delayed capillary refill and weak peripheral pulses.

== Transmission ==
Human is the only known reservoir for EV-71. The faecal-oral route is the main mode of transmission. Another mode of transmission is through respiratory droplets. EV-71 virus may continuously shed into faeces up to 42 days after the infection, longer than its shedding into the throat. Children usually get infected in childcare facilities or get it from household contacts. Adults usually do not show any symptoms of HFMD, but may shed the virus and infect other children in the process. Enterovirus may persist in the environment for three days under room temperatures such as in sewage and water systems. Transmission through blood is rare. Although enteroviruses are generally transmitted to newborns during delivery, however, there is only one case reported for EV-71 transmission during delivery.

== Treatment ==
The majority of the HFMD infections are of stage I which do not require hospitalisation and can be treated symptomatically. Those with stage II disease is hospitalised and monitored. Immunoglobulin therapy is used in stage II to reduce the risk of death. The exact mechanism of immunoglobulin therapy in treating the disease is unknown, but it can reduce the level of inflammatory markers produced against the EV-71 virus in children with pulmonary oedema (accumulation of water within lung tissues and air spaces. A high level of inflammatory markers causes cytokine storm which is life-threatening instead of helping to fight against the infection. In those with stage III HFMD, intensive care support is required. Milrinone can be useful in increasing the cardiac output. In those with stage IV disease with limb weakness, limb atrophy and dysphagia, physical therapy is needed. Long-term respiratory support is needed for those with dysfunctioning thoracic diaphragm.

== Prognosis ==
EV-71 can infect the heart muscles, causing acute viral myocarditis that ultimately leads to acute congestive heart failure, cardiovascular collapse, and death. Dual infection with other enteroviruses or adenovirus does not increase the risk of neurological complications.

== Aftermath ==
HFMD outbreaks in Sarawak continued in 3-yearly cycles in 2003, 2006, and 2008/2009 with deaths reported in each of the outbreak. EV-71 was seen during the years of the outbreak while Cosackie-A16 virus was seen during the years between the outbreaks. As of 2011, EV-71 type B4 and B5 were the most common variant that circulate in Sarawak. HFMD cases usually increased between March and June during surveillance of the disease from 1998 to 2005.

On 12 October 2006, statutory notification of HFMD is enforced. In 2007, Ministry of Health Malaysia released HFMD management guidelines. Under this guideline, two or more HFMD cases reported in a childcare facility should be closed for 10 days from the last case detected and should be thoroughly disinfected.

== See also ==
- Enterovirus
