= 2018 Malaysia HFMD outbreak =

Outbreak of hand, foot and mouth disease among children in Malaysia

- Disease: Hand, foot, and mouth disease
- Pathogen: Coxsackievirus A16 and Enterovirus 71
- Index case: January 2018
- Confirmed cases: more than 50,000
- Deaths: 2

Beginning in January 2018, an outbreak of hand, foot, and mouth disease (HFMD) occurred among children nationwide across Malaysia. Nearly 38,000 cases were recorded between January 1 and July 26, and by August 14 the total number of cases had risen to 51,000. Among the states and federal territories affected by the outbreak, Selangor recorded the highest cases with 11,349, Kuala Lumpur with 4,428 and Sarawak with 4,412 cases as reported in July 2018. At least two children in Sarawak and Penang died from complications caused by the virus.

== Background and history ==
HFMD transmission outbreak in Malaysia was first reported in the state of Sarawak in 1997 where between 28 and 31 children died as a result of infection by the Enterovirus 71 (EV-A71) virus. Since then, recurrent cyclical epidemics of HFMD have occurred in the country every two to three years. While the root cause behind the recurrence of the disease remains a mystery, another factor that has been identified as increasing the spread of the disease among children is travel to neighbouring countries with high infection rates. Through autopsies performed on deceased individuals, death has been attributed to several symptoms linked to the disease such as poor peripheral perfusion, tachycardia and cardiac failures. These individuals had also developed symptoms earlier on such as shock, pallor, cold extremities, delayed capillary refill and weak peripheral pulses. In 1998, the Ministry of Health acknowledged that the disease was endemic in the country with periodic outbreaks among young children. Since the first outbreak, the Ministry of Health has periodically ordered the closure of affected kindergartens and schools which are likely to be the source area of the disease. A further outbreak of 1,178 cases, mostly in kindergartens nurseries, was reported in the state of Johor in 2000 following an outbreak in neighbouring Singapore a month before.

== Authorities response ==
In July 2018, Malaysian Health Ministry Disease Control Division director Chong Chee Keong said toys were among the cause of immediate spread of the virus to other children. The Health Ministry further reported that HFMD disease cases had exceeded warning levels. To prevent spread, the Ministry urged parents to act as "gate-keepers" in order to ensure children infected with the disease did not go to school and to seek immediate treatment if their children showed signs of infection. The Education Ministry issued a letter to every school to monitor the health of their students. The Health Ministry also considered the use of vaccines from other countries, though research on vaccines had to be carried out before they could be approved for local use. As infection rates increased among children, the local health department of Penang ordered all supermarkets and shopping complexes in the state to disinfect trolleys, toys and benches on their premises. Disinfection was also carried out in all villages, schools and preschools in a district in Sarawak.

== See also ==
- Enterovirus
