= List of adverse effects of trazodone =

This is a list of adverse effects of the antidepressant trazodone, sorted by frequency of occurrence.

== Very common ==
Very common (>10% incidence) adverse effects include:

- Blurred vision
- Dizziness
- Somnolence
- Dry mouth
- Nausea
- Headache
- Fatigue

== Common ==
Common (1–10% incidence) adverse effects include:

- Vomiting
- Constipation
- Diarrhea
- Backache
- Confusion
- Insomnia
- Dream disorder (abnormal dreaming)
- Disorientation
- Incoordination
- Nasal congestion
- Orthostatic hypotension
- Syncope
- Tremor
- Weight change
- Anxiety
- Hypotension
- Oedema
- Dysgeusia
- Memory impairment
- Migraine
- Paraesthesia (feelings of "pins and needles")
- Agitation
- Dyspnoea
- Night sweats

== Uncommon ==
Uncommon (0.1–1% incidence) adverse effects include:

- Hypersensitivity reaction
- Muscle twitching
- Amnesia
- Aphasia
- Hypoesthesia
- Speech disorder
- Bladder pain
- Urinary incontinence
- Gait disturbance
- Reflux oesophagitis
- Dry eye
- Eye pain
- Photophobia
- Hypoacusis
- Tinnitus
- Vertigo
- Acne
- Hyperhidrosis
- Photosensitivity reaction
- Flushing

== Rare ==
Rare (<0.1%) adverse effects include:

- Urinary retention
- Prolonged QT interval
- Torsades de Pointes
- Ataxia
- Breast enlargement or engorgement
- Lactation
- Cardiospasm
- Stroke
- Chills
- Cholestasis
- Clitorism
- Congestive heart failure
- Diplopia
- Extrapyramidal symptoms
- Hallucinations
- Haemolytic anaemia
- Hirsutism
- Hyperbilirubinaemia
- Increased amylase
- Increased salivation
- Leukocytosis
- Leukonychia
- Jaundice
- Liver enzyme alterations
- Methemoglobinemia
- Paraesthesia
- Paranoia
- Stupor
- Rash
- Seizure
- Priapism
- Pruritus
- Psoriasis
- Psychosis
- Suicidal ideation
- Suicidal behaviour
- Syndrome of inappropriate antidiuretic hormone secretion
- Tardive dyskinesia
- Serotonin syndrome
- Unexplained death
- Urticaria
- Vasodilation
