= Onychomadesis =

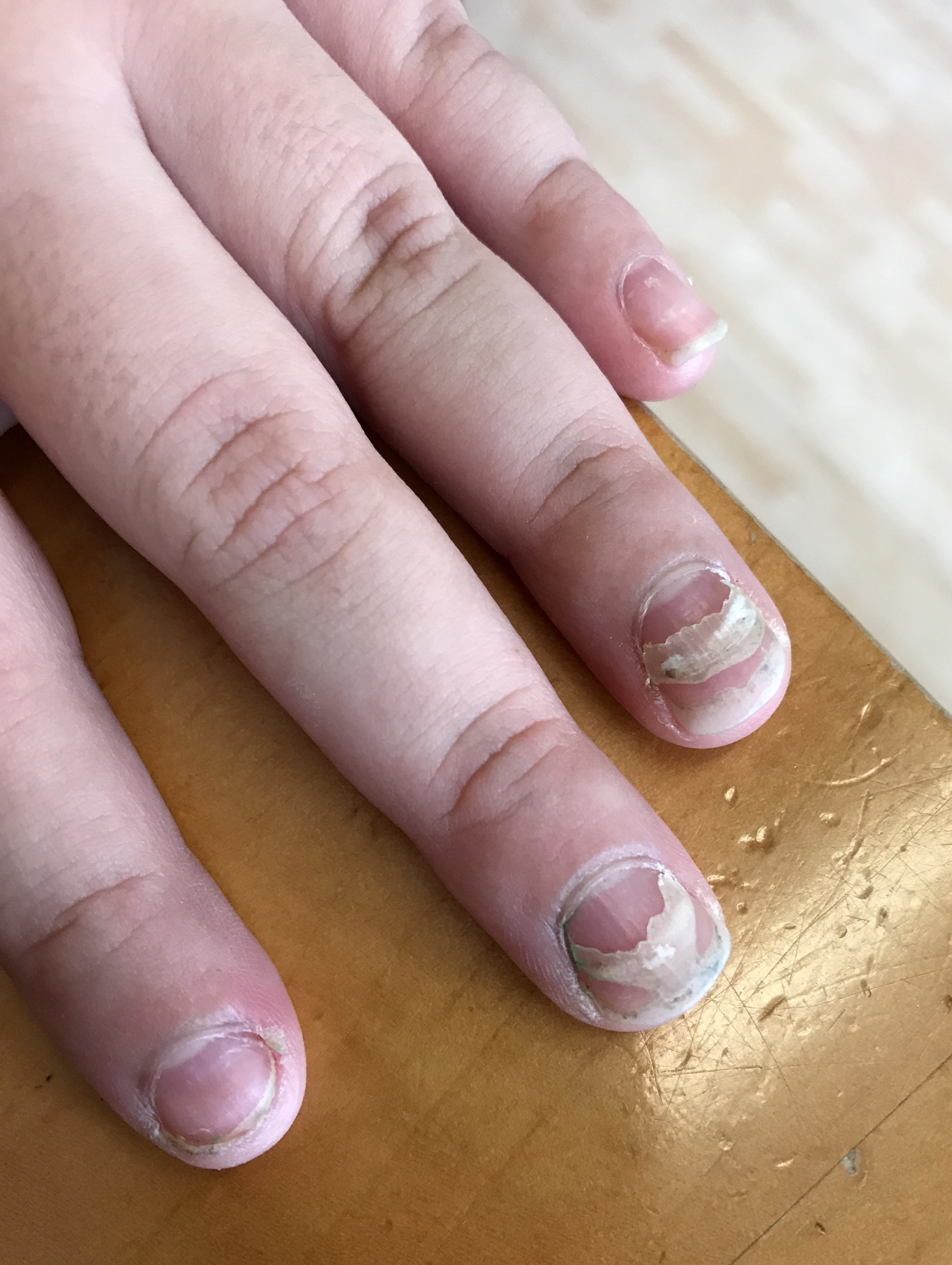
- Onychomadesis appeared following a hand, foot, and mouth disease in a child.
- Specialty: Dermatology

Onychomadesis is a periodic idiopathic shedding of the nails beginning at the proximal end, possibly caused by the temporary arrest of the function of the nail matrix. One cause in children is hand, foot, and mouth disease. This generally resolves without complication.

== Signs and symptoms ==
Onychomadesis is defined by the nail plate's detachment from the matrix, its continuous connection to the nail bed, and, frequently but not always, shedding. Beau lines are transverse ridges on the nail plates. Onychomadesis might be considered a more severe version of Beau lines.

== Causes ==
Onychomadesis has been linked to autoimmune diseases, physical trauma, pharmacological side effects, and viral infections, especially coxsackieviruses. However, in certain cases, the cause remains unknown. Athletes, especially runners, may be more likely to experience toenail involvement. A portion of patients have onychomadesis recurrently without an obvious cause. One of the most frequent causes of single-digit onychomadesis is local damage to the nail bed. When more than one finger is involved, it may indicate a systemic cause.

== Diagnosis ==
Onychomadesis is diagnosed clinically. Beau lines and total nail shedding can be distinguished from one another by looking at and palpating the nail plate to identify distinct nail alterations. The diagnosis can be verified by ultrasonography because the abnormality can be seen beneath the proximal nail fold.

== Treatment ==
Most cases of onychomadesis are minor and self-limiting. There is no specific treatment, although a conservative approach to care is suggested. Recurrent onychomadesis may be avoided by treating any underlying medical issues or stopping the offending medication.

It is advised to provide supportive treatment in addition to protecting the nail bed by keeping nails short and covering the afflicted nails with adhesive bandages to prevent snagging the nail or tearing off the partially attached nails.

Topical administration of urea cream 40% under occlusion or halcinonide cream 0.1% under occlusion for 5–6 days has been used to treat onychomadesis in certain patients, although these therapies have not always proven successful. It has been suggested to apply basic fibroblast growth factor externally to promote fresh nail plate regrowth.

== See also ==
- Patterned acquired hypertrichosis
- List of cutaneous conditions
