= Leukonychia =

White spots on finger and toe nails

- Other names: White nails or Milk spots
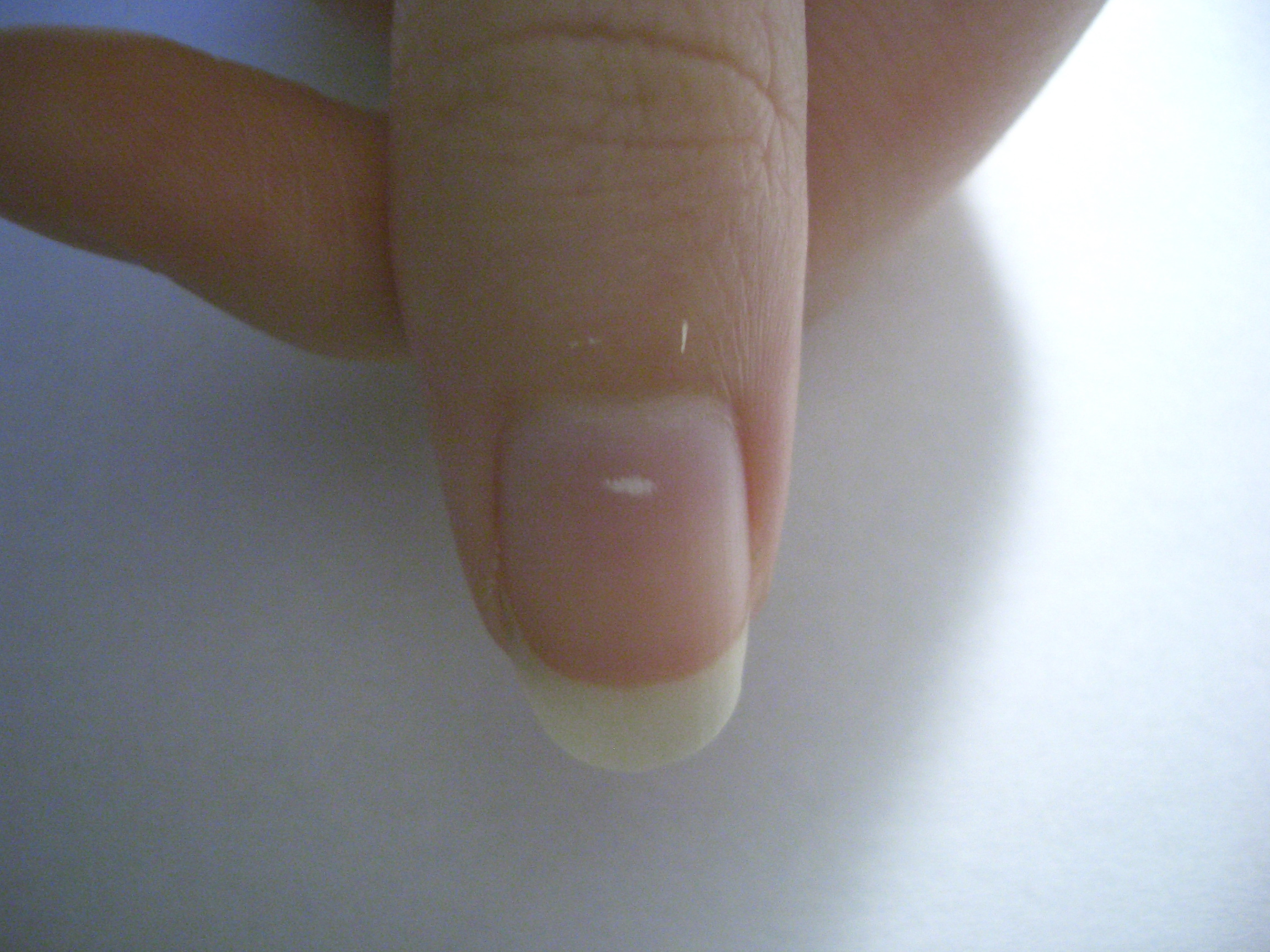
- Specialty: Dermatology

Leukonychia (or leuconychia) is a medical term for white discoloration appearing on nails. It is derived from the Greek words leuko 'white' and onyx 'nail'. The most common cause is injury to the base of the nail (the matrix) where the nail is formed.

== Types ==
=== Leukonychia totalis ===
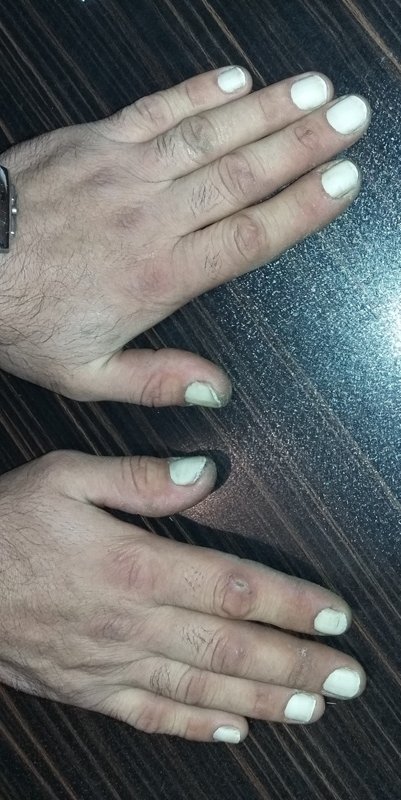
Leukonychia totalis

This condition consists of a whitening of the entire nail and mostly likely occurs on all nails. Whitening of one, and only one, entire nail is not recognized as a symptom of leukonychia totalis but as a likely result of mechanical trauma. Leukonychia totalis may be a clinical sign of hypoalbuminaemia (low albumin), which can be seen in nephrotic syndrome (a form of kidney failure), liver failure, protein malabsorption and protein-losing enteropathies. A genetic condition or a side effect from taking sulphonamides (a family of antibiotics) can also cause this appearance. By 2011, only 6 cases of non-hereditary leukonychia totalis were published.

In familial cases of leukonychia totalis, this condition is caused by mutations in the PLCD1 gene, in chromosome 3p22.2, this mutation shows an autosomal dominant pattern of inheritance, but in some cases, this condition may be autosomal recessive.

=== Leukonychia partialis ===
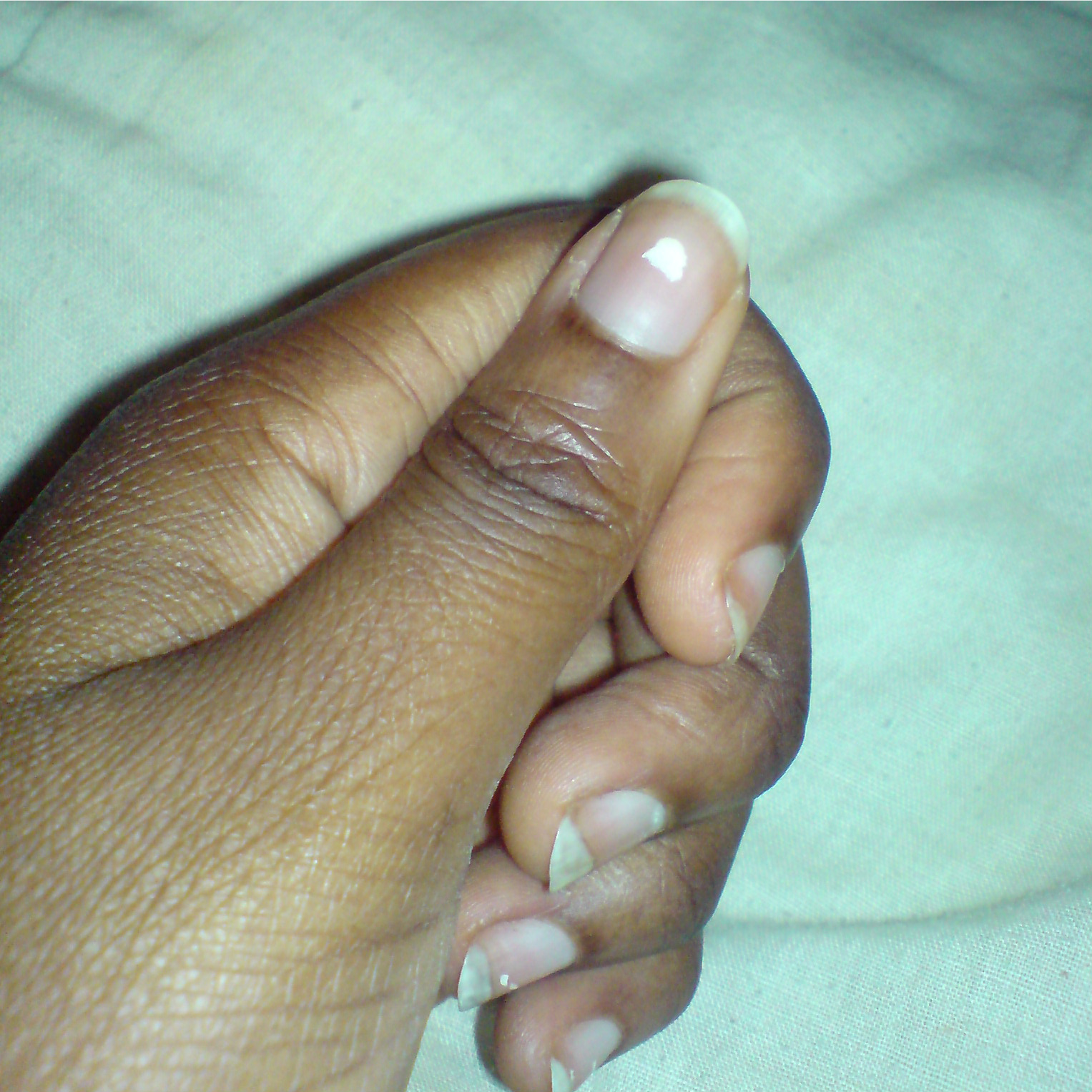
Leukonychia partialis

This condition consists of a whitening of parts of the nail plate in the form of small white dots. There are three different variations of partial leukonychia; punctate, transverse and longitudinal leukonychia. Some of the more serious variations of leukonychia partialis may lead to leukonychia totalis.

==== Leukonychia striata ====
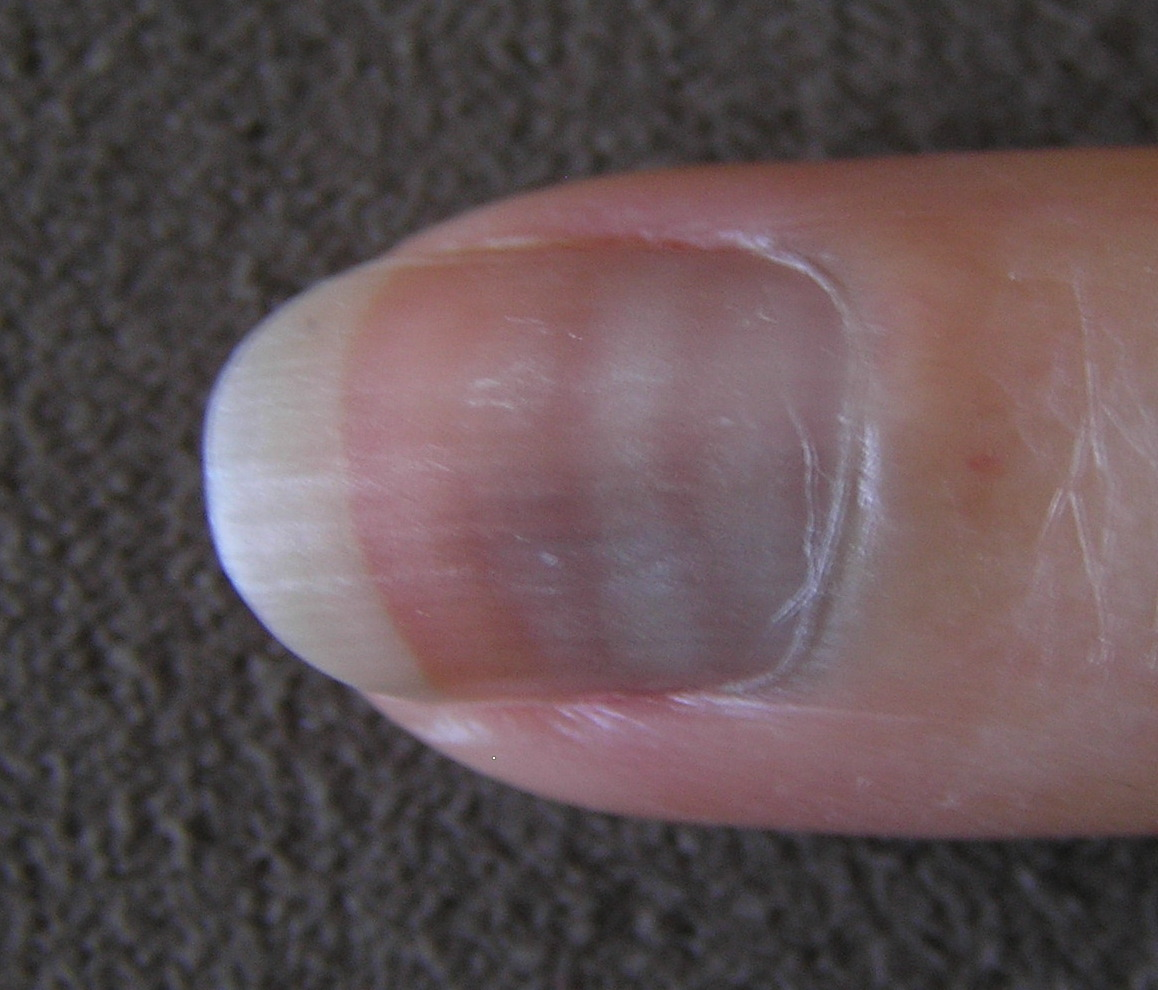
Leukonychia striata

Leukonychia striata, transverse leukonychia, or Mees' lines are a whitening or discoloration of the nail in bands or "stria" that run parallel to the lunula (nail base). This is commonly caused by physical injury or disruption of the nail matrix. Common examples include excessive biting or tapping of the nails, trauma or injury from accidents involving doors or windows, and extensive use of manicure. It may also occur in great toenails as a result of trauma from footwear. Alternatively, the condition can be caused by heavy metal poisoning, most commonly by arsenic. Finally, it can be caused by cirrhosis of the liver or chemotherapy.

The tendency toward leukonychia striata is sometimes inherited in an autosomal dominant fashion. In other cases, it can be attributed to vigorous manicuring and trauma aforementioned, or to a wide variety of systemic illnesses. Serious infections known for high fevers, measles, malaria, herpes, and leprosy may also cause this condition. In many patients, there is no obvious cause, and the streaks resolve spontaneously.

There is a similar condition called Muehrcke's lines (apparent leukonychia) which differs from leukonychia in that the lines fade with digital compression and do not migrate with the growth of the nail.

==== Leukonychia punctata ====
Also known as "true" leukonychia, this is the most common form of leukonychia, in which small white spots appear on the nails. Picking and biting of the nails are a prominent cause in young children and nail biters. Besides parakeratosis, air that is trapped between the cells may also cause this appearance. It is also caused by trauma. In most cases, when white spots appear on a single or a couple of fingernails or toenails, the most common cause is injury to the base (matrix) of the nail. When this is the case, white spots disappear after around eight months, which is the amount of time the nails take to regrow completely. The pattern and number of spots may change as the nail grows.

==== Longitudinal leukonychia ====
Longitudinal leukonychia is far less common and features smaller 1mm white longitudinal lines visible under the nail plate and perpendicular to the nail bed. It may be associated with Darier's disease.

=== Apparent leukonychia ===
Apparent leukonychia is caused by changes in the nail bed that are visible through the nail plate. A number of patterns of apparent leukoncychia, including Terry's nails, half-and-half (Lindsay's) nails, and Muehrcke's lines, have been classically characterized.

== Cause ==
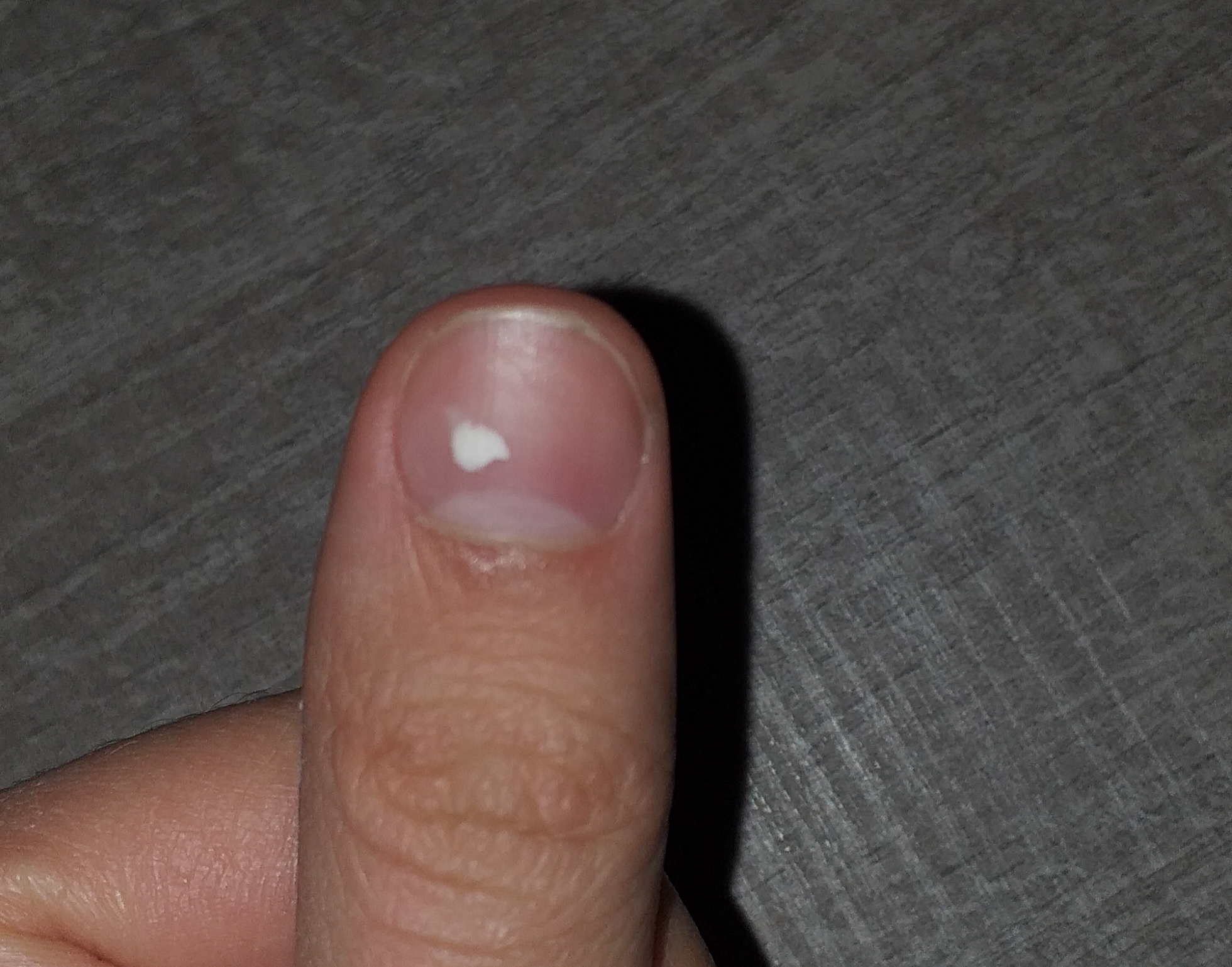
Particularly large white spot

It is harmless and most commonly caused by minor injuries, such as nail biting, or may occur while the nail is growing. Some people suggest that it may be caused by calcium deficiency, although this is not backed up by research. Leukonychia occurs most commonly in healthy individuals, and is unrelated to any known nutritional or physiological deficiency. When caused by injury the marks will disappear as the nail grows outwards. While there are various sources that link dietary needs or vitamin deficiency with recurrent leukonychia, this notion has been challenged by some medical researchers. It sometimes only occurs on certain fingers.

Other possible reasons for this problem can be linked to:

- Arsenic poisoning
- Lead poisoning
- Pneumonia
- Heart disease
- Kidney failure
- Ill health
- Hypoalbuminemia
- Vitamin deficiency
- Ulcerative colitis
- Liver cirrhosis
- Psychogenic stresses
- Onychophagia
- Trauma injury
- Occupational trauma
- Zinc deficiency
- Protein deficiency
- Psoriasis
- Eczema
- Iron deficiency

== Diagnosis ==
A doctor will take a thorough medical history, and may take blood tests as well as examining liver and kidney function. Intracellular (red blood cell) assays are more sensitive than tests for plasma levels.

== Treatment ==
Improvements have been reported from treating malnutrition associated with zinc deficiency and other minerals.
