= Limb-and-mouth disease =

Limb-and-mouth disease may refer to:

- Foot-and-mouth disease
- Hand, foot, and mouth disease, in humans
