= Joseph Honoré Simon Beau =

French physician

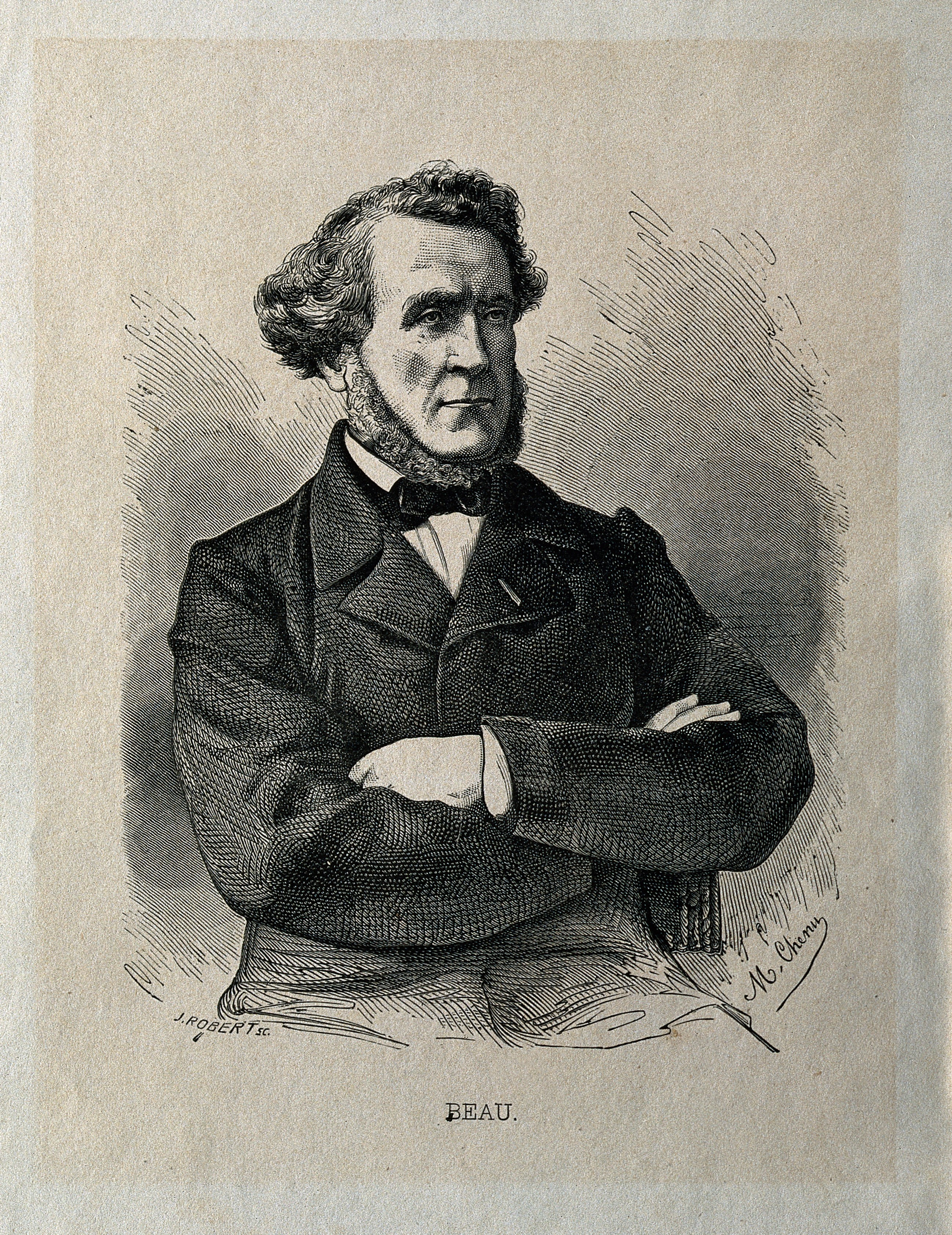
Joseph Honoré Simon Beau – wood engraving by J. Robert after M. Chenu

Joseph Honoré Simon Beau (8 May 1806 in Collonges, department of Ain – 11 August 1865) was a French medical doctor, who is famous for his investigations of the physiology of the heart and the lungs.

In 1836 he obtained his doctorate in Paris with the thesis De l’emploi des évacuants, etc. From 1840 he was an assigned as a physician to the "Bureau central", earning his agrégation several years later (1844). In July 1856 he became a member of the Académie Nationale de Médecine.

He was a leading advocate of pathological physiology. Treatises involving his studies of the heart and lungs were initially published in the Archives générales de médecine (1834 to 1845), and compiled in his Traité expérimental et clinique d'auscultation appliqué à l'étude des maladies du poumon et du coeur (1856).

== Selected writings ==
- Traité expérimental et clinique d'auscultation, appliquée à l'étude des maladies du poumon et du coeur, 1856 – Treatise on experimental and clinical auscultation, applicable to the study of lung and heart diseases.
- De la Valeur thérapeutique des saignées générales dans les phlegmasies, leçons cliniques faites à la Charité, 1859 – On the therapeutic value of general bloodletting for phlebitis, clinical lessons performed at the Charité.
- De la Diastole ventriculaire dans l'ordre de succession des mouvements du coeur, extrait de leçons cliniques sur les maladies du coeur, 1861 – On ventricular diastole, etc.; excerpt of clinical lessons on diseases of the heart.
- Nouvelles Réflexions sur un nouveau tracé cardiographique de MM. Chauveau et Marey, 1864 – On the new tracé cardiographique of Auguste Chauveau and Étienne-Jules Marey.
- Traité de la dyspepsie, 1866 – Treatise on dyspepsia.

== See also ==
- Beau's lines: Transverse grooves on the nail plate, usually an indication of systemic disease.
- Beau's syndrome: Defined as myocardial insufficiency and inability of the heart to perform a complete systole.
