= Robert C. Muehrcke =

Robert C. Muehrcke (4 August 1921, Cincinnati, Ohio – 9 November 2003) was an American physician, known for his description of the clinical sign called Muehrcke's nails.

At the entry of the US into WW II, he joined the 132nd Infantry Regiment and served with the regiment in Guadalcanal. In 1945 he was in Okinawa with the 96th Infantry Division. (In 1982 he published a book, Orchids in the Mud, of personal accounts concerning these wartime campaigns.) He graduated from the University of Illinois College of Medicine in 1952. In Chicago he was an associate attending physician at Research and Educational Hospital and Cook County Hospital and an instructor in medicine at the University of Illinois College of Medicine. In the later years of his career he was in the Department of Medicine of West Suburban Hospital, Oak Park. He retired in 1992.

He married in 1972. Upon his death, he was survived by his wife, seven sons, and nine grandchildren.
