= Beau's lines =

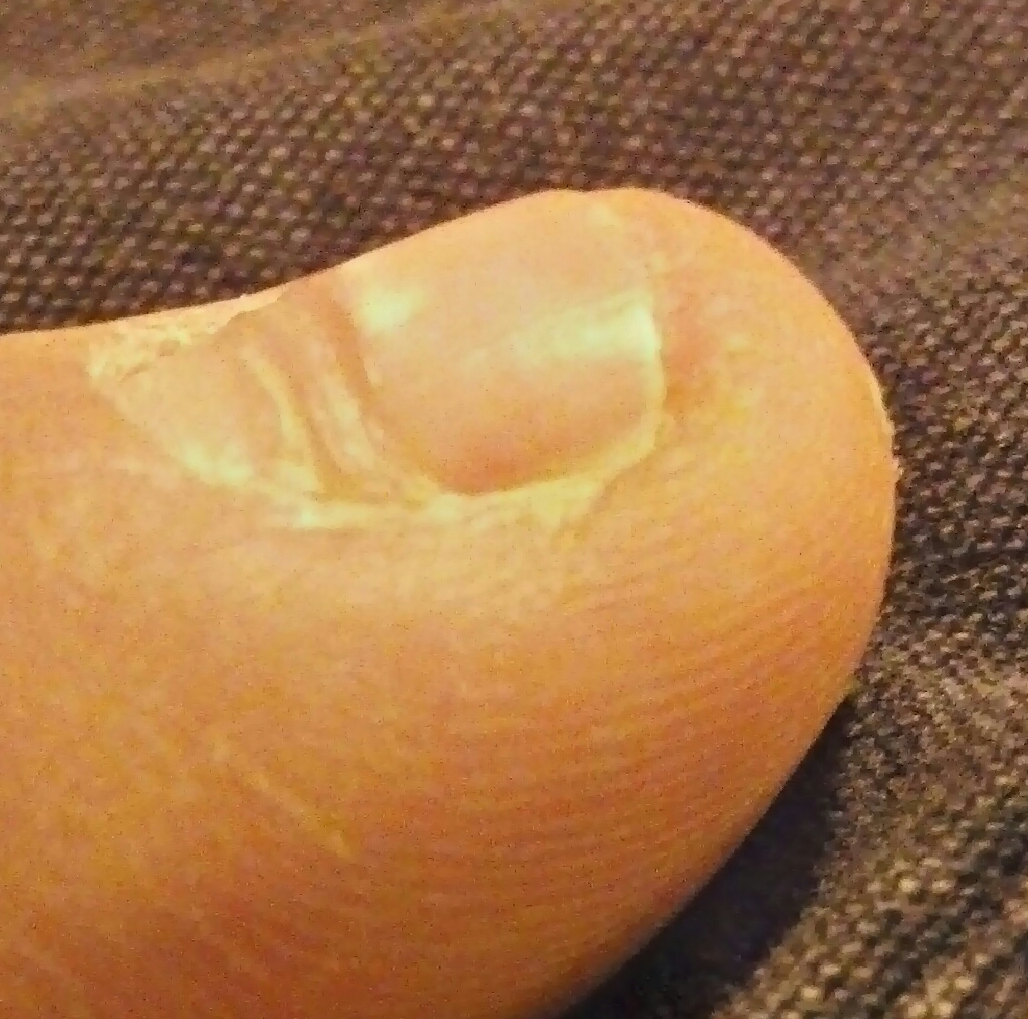
- Beau's lines on the middle fingernail of the left hand caused by a severe paronychia infection
- Specialty: Dermatology

Beau's lines are deep grooved lines that run from side to side on the fingernail or the toenail. They may look like indentations or ridges in the nail plate.

This condition of the nail was named by a French physician, Joseph Honoré Simon Beau (1806–1865), who first described it in 1846.

== Signs and symptoms ==
Beau's lines are horizontal, going across the nailline, and should not be confused with vertical ridges going from the bottom (cuticle) of the nail out to the fingertip. These vertical lines are usually a natural consequence of aging and are harmless.

Beau's lines should also be distinguished from Muehrcke's lines of the fingernails. While Beau's lines are actual ridges and indentations in the nail plate, Muehrcke lines are areas of hypopigmentation without palpable ridges; they affect the underlying nail bed, and not the nail itself. Beau's lines should also be distinguished from Mees' lines of the fingernails, which are areas of discoloration in the nail plate.

As the nail grows out, the ridge in the nail can be seen to move upwards until it reaches the fingertip. When it reaches this point the fingertips can become sore for a few days as the nail bed is exposed by the misshapen nail.

== Causes ==
There are several causes of Beau's lines. It is believed that there is a temporary cessation of cell division in the nail matrix. This may be caused by an infection or problem in the nail fold, where the nail begins to form, or it may be caused by an injury to that area. Some other reasons for these lines include trauma, coronary occlusion, hypocalcaemia, and skin disease. They may be a sign of systemic disease, or may also be caused by an illness of the body, as well as drugs used in chemotherapy, or malnutrition. Beau's lines can also be seen one to two months after the onset of fever in children with Kawasaki disease. Conditions also associated with Beau's lines include uncontrolled diabetes and peripheral vascular disease, as well as illnesses associated with a high fever, such as scarlet fever, measles, mumps and pneumonia. Beau's lines can also be a sign of zinc deficiency.

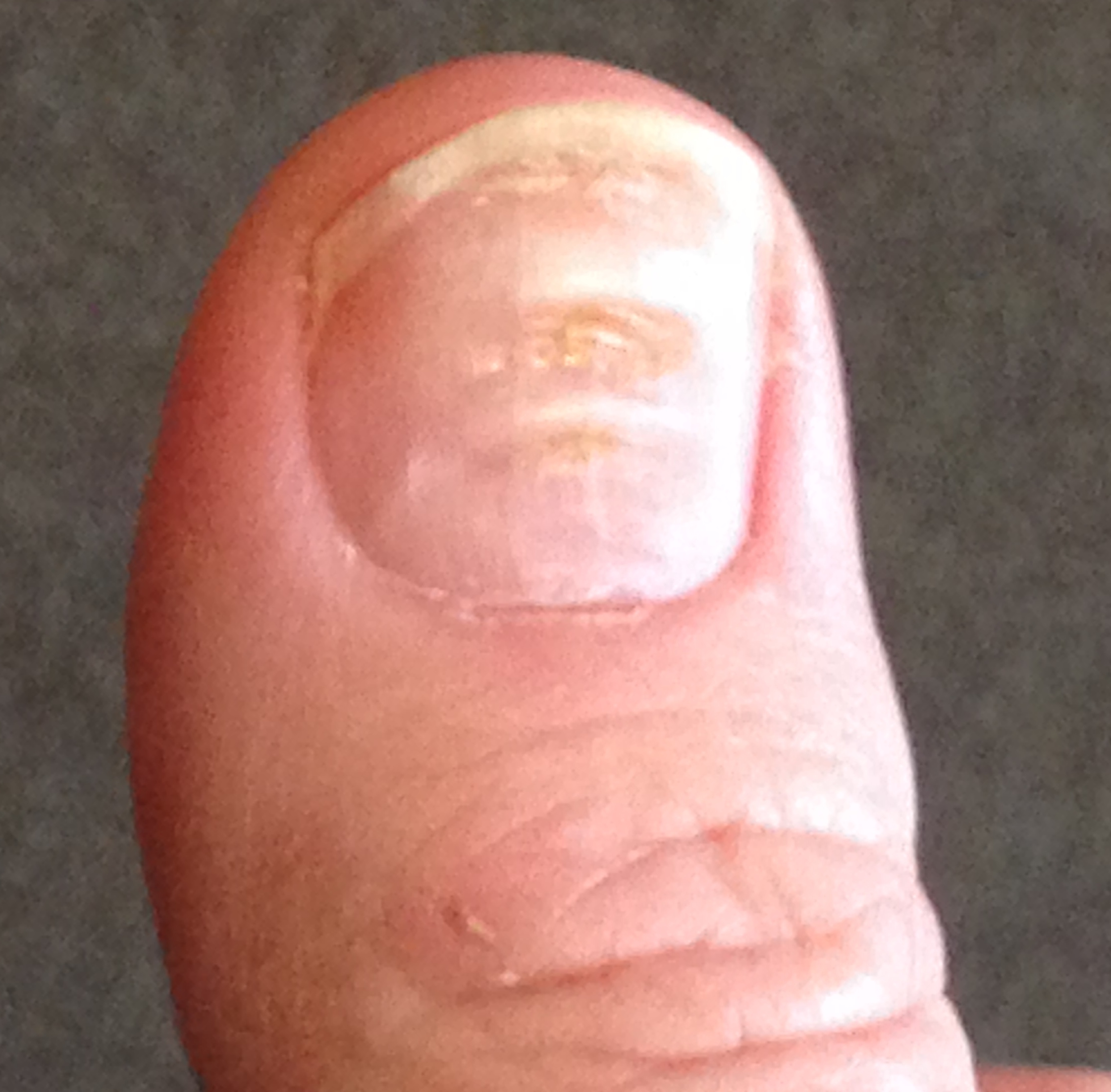

A researcher found Beau's lines in the fingernails of two of six divers following a deep saturation dive to a pressure equal to 305 metres (1,001 ft) of sea water, and in six of six divers following a similar dive to 335 metres (1,099 ft). They have also been seen in Ötzi the Iceman.

Human nails grow at a rate which varies with many factors: age, the specific digit, as well as nutrition. However, typically in healthy populations fingernails grow at about 0.1 mm/day and toenails at about 0.05 mm/day.

== See also ==
- List of cutaneous conditions
