= Mees' lines =

Clinical sign involving white bands across the nails

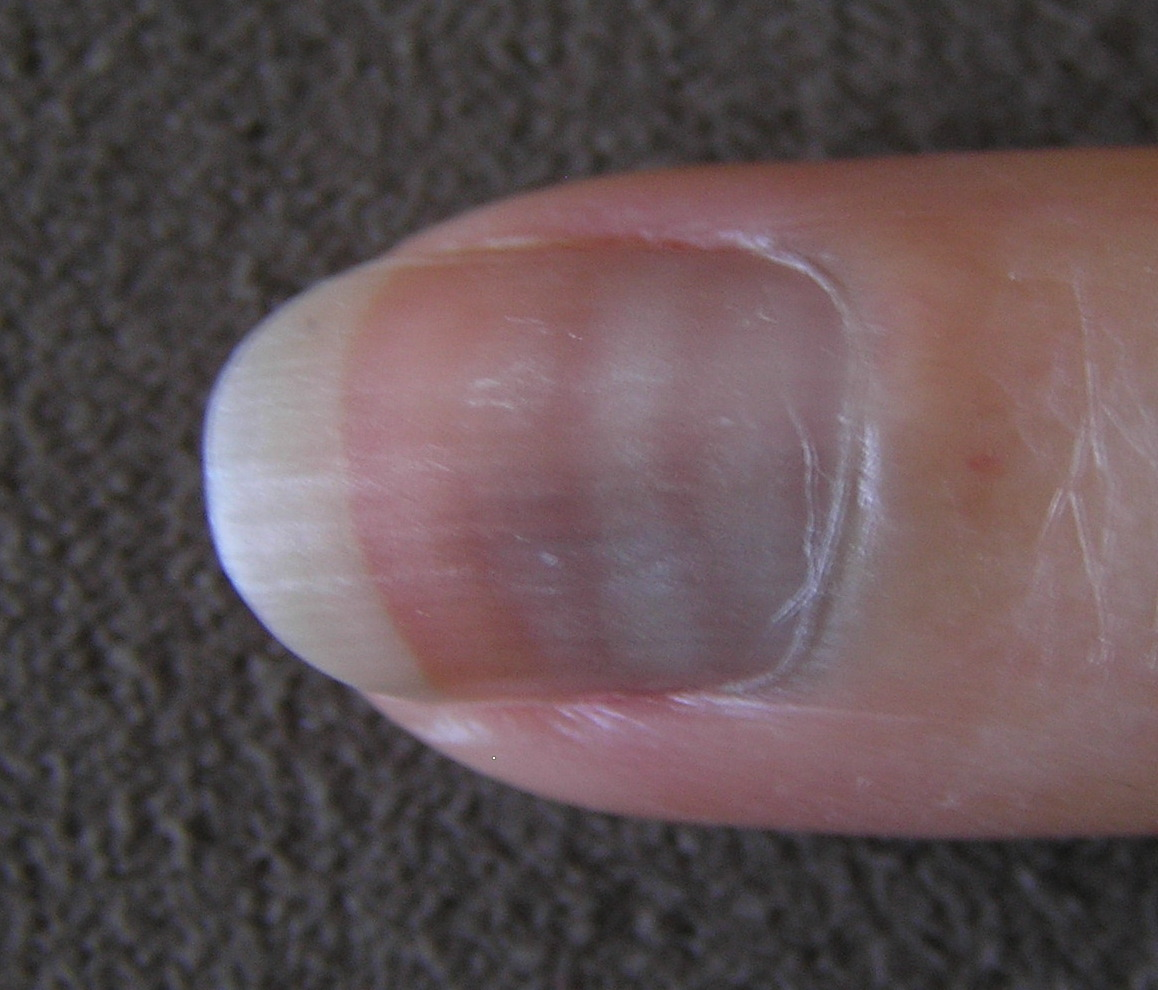
- Specialty: Dermatology

Mees' lines or Aldrich–Mees lines, also called leukonychia striata, are white lines of discoloration across the nails of the fingers and toes.

== Presentation ==
They are typically white bands traversing the width of the nail. As the nail grows they move towards the end, and finally disappear when trimmed.

== Causes ==
Mees' lines can look similar to injury to the nail, which should not be confused with true Mees' lines.

Mees' lines appear after an episode of poisoning with arsenic, thallium or other heavy metals or selenium, opioid MT-45, and can also appear if the subject is suffering from kidney failure. They have been observed in chemotherapy patients.

== Eponym and history ==
Although the phenomenon is named after Dutch physician R. A. Mees, who described the abnormality in 1919, earlier descriptions of the same abnormality were made by Englishman E. S. Reynolds in 1901 and by American C. J. Aldrich in 1904.

== See also ==
- Leukonychia
- List of cutaneous conditions
- Muehrcke's nails – a similar condition, except the lines are underneath the nails and so do not move as the nail grows
