= Hand, foot, and mouth disease =

Common human disease caused by a group of viruses

- Other names: Enteroviral vesicular stomatitis with exanthem
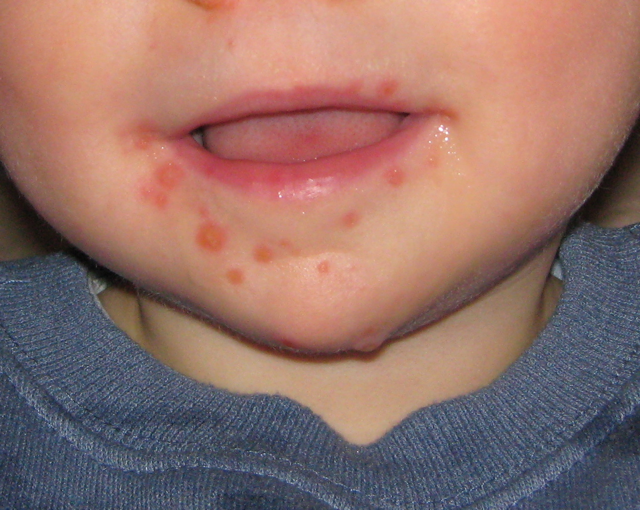
- Small reddish spots and bumps around mouth in HFMD
- Specialty: Infectious disease
- Symptoms: Fever, flat discolored spots or bumps that may blister
- Complications: Temporary loss of nails, viral meningitis
- Usual onset: 3–6 days post exposure
- Duration: 1 week
- Causes: Coxsackievirus A16, Enterovirus 71
- Diagnostic method: Based on symptoms, viral culture
- Prevention: Handwashing
- Treatment: Supportive care
- Medication: Pain medication such as ibuprofen
- Frequency: As outbreaks

Hand, foot, and mouth disease (HFMD) is a common infection caused by a group of enteroviruses. It typically begins with a fever and feeling generally unwell. This is followed a day or two later by flat discolored spots or bumps that may blister, on the hands, feet and mouth and occasionally buttocks and groin. Signs and symptoms normally appear 3–6 days after exposure to the virus. The rash generally resolves on its own in about a week.

The viruses that cause HFMD are spread through close personal contact, through the air from coughing, and via the feces of an infected person. Contaminated objects can also spread the disease. Coxsackievirus A16 is the most common cause, and enterovirus 71 is the second-most common cause. Other strains of coxsackievirus and enterovirus can also be responsible. Some people may carry and pass on the virus despite having no symptoms of disease. No animals are involved in transmission. Diagnosis can often be made based on symptoms. Occasionally, a throat or stool sample may be tested for the virus.

Most people with hand, foot, and mouth disease get better on their own in 7 to 10 days. Most cases require no specific treatment. No antiviral medication or vaccine is available, but development efforts are underway. For fever and for painful mouth sores, over-the-counter pain medications such as ibuprofen may be used, though aspirin should be avoided in children. The illness is usually not serious. Occasionally, intravenous fluids are given to dehydrated children. Very rarely, viral meningitis or encephalitis may complicate the disease.

HFMD occurs in all areas of the world. It often occurs in small outbreaks in nursery schools or kindergartens. Large outbreaks have been occurring in Asia since 1997. It usually occurs during the spring, summer, and fall months. Typically, it occurs in children less than five years old but can occasionally occur in adults. HFMD should not be confused with foot-and-mouth disease (also known as hoof-and-mouth disease), which mostly affects livestock.

== Signs and symptoms ==
Common constitutional signs and symptoms of HFMD include fever, nausea, vomiting, feeling tired, generalized discomfort, loss of appetite, and irritability in infants and toddlers. Skin lesions frequently develop in the form of a rash of flat discolored spots and bumps which may be followed by vesicular sores with blisters on palms of the hands, soles of the feet, buttocks, and sometimes on the lips. The rash is rarely itchy for children, but can be extremely itchy for adults. Painful facial ulcers, blisters, or lesions may also develop in or around the nose or mouth. HFMD usually resolves on its own after 7–10 days. Most cases of the disease are relatively harmless, but complications, including encephalitis, meningitis, and paralysis that mimics the neurological symptoms of polio, can occur.

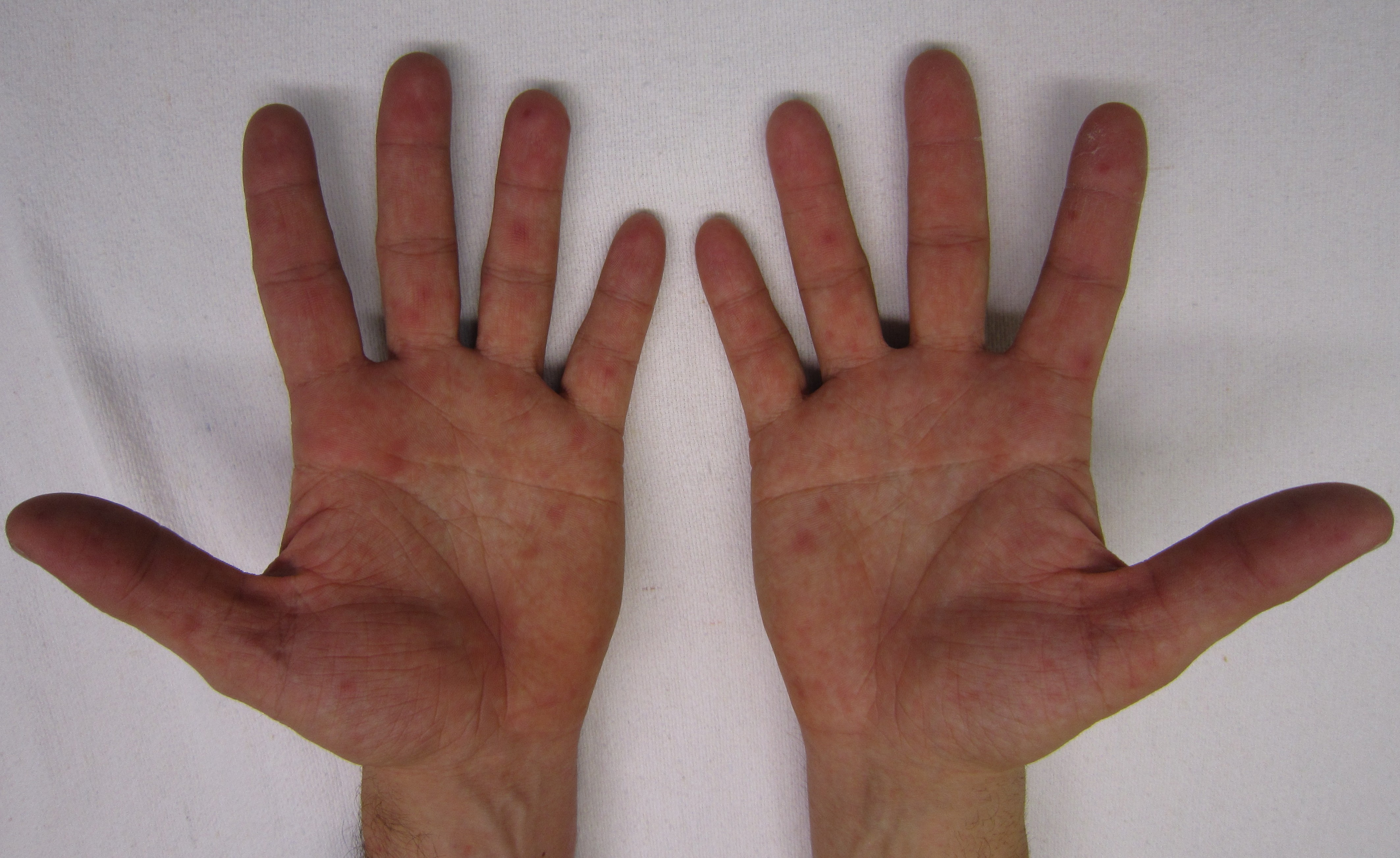
Rash on palms of the hands

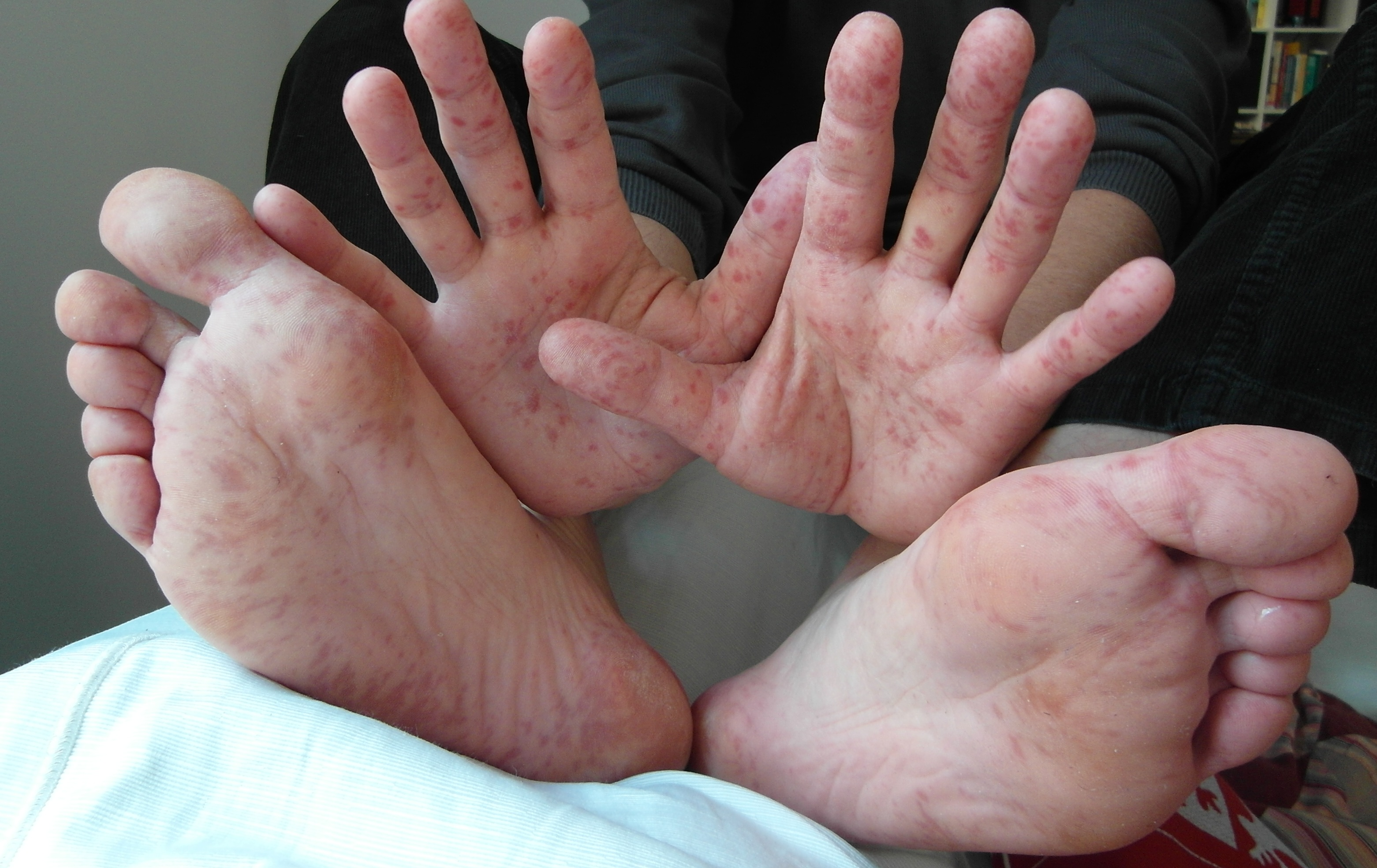
Rash on hands and feet of a 36-year-old man

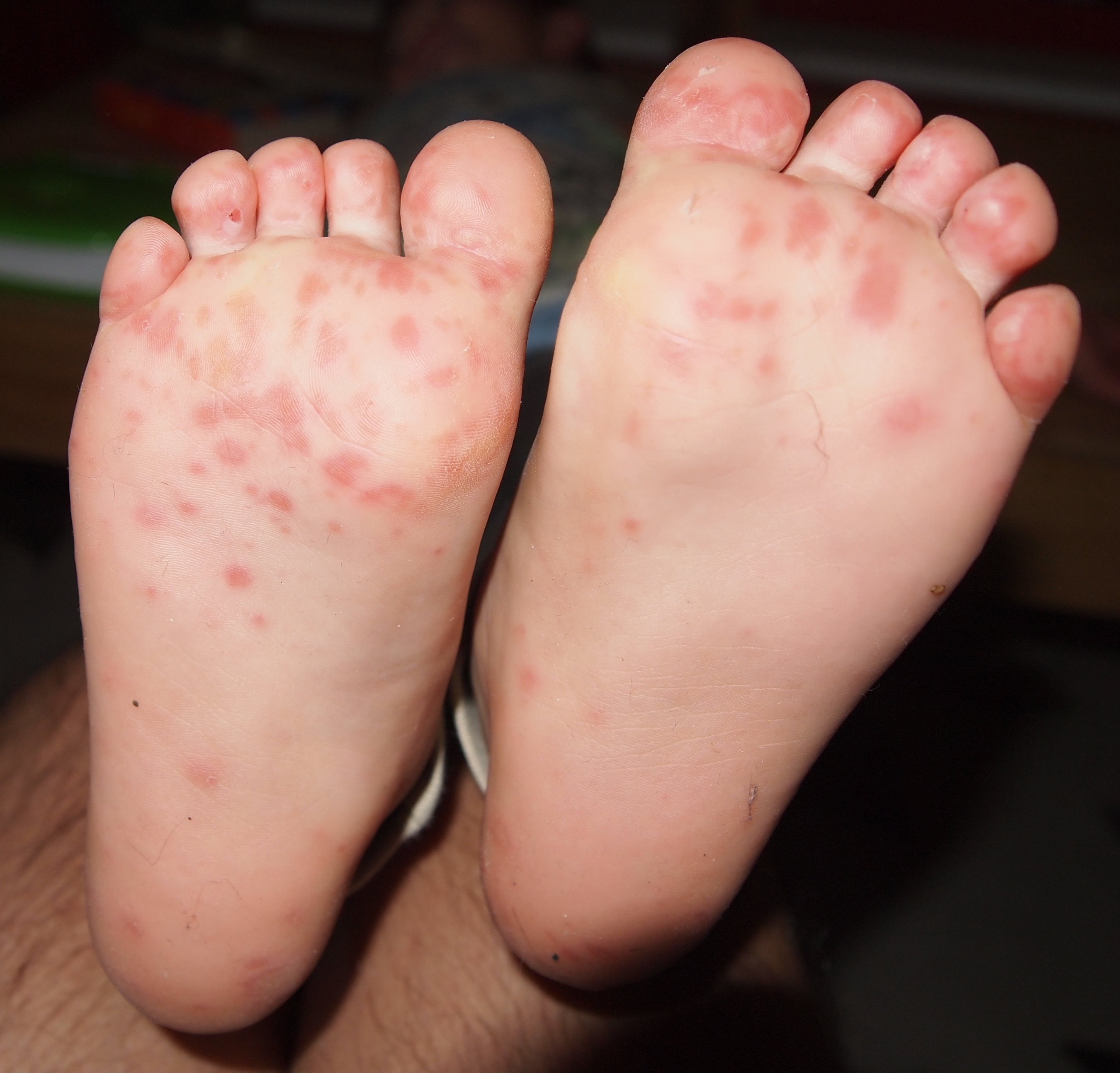
Rash on the soles of a child's feet

== Cause ==
The viruses that cause the disease are of the Picornaviridae family. Coxsackievirus A16 (CV-A16) is the most common cause of HFMD. Enterovirus 71 (EV-71) is the second-most common cause. Many other strains of coxsackievirus and enterovirus can also be responsible, such as CV-A6 and CV-A10.

=== Transmission ===
HFMD is highly contagious and is transmitted by nasopharyngeal secretions such as saliva or nasal mucus, direct contact, or fecal–oral transmission. It is possible to be infectious for days to weeks after the symptoms have resolved.

Childcare settings are the most common places for HFMD to be contracted because of toilet training and diaper changes. HFMD is contracted through nose and throat secretions such as saliva, sputum, and nasal mucus, as well as fluid in blisters and stool.

== Diagnosis ==
A diagnosis can usually be made by the presenting signs and symptoms alone. If the diagnosis is unclear, a throat swab or stool specimen may be taken to identify the virus by culture. The common incubation period (the time between infection and onset of symptoms) ranges from three to six days. Early detection of HFMD is important to preventing an outbreak in the pediatric population.

== Prevention ==
Preventive measures include avoiding direct contact with infected individuals (including keeping infected children home from school), proper cleaning of shared utensils, disinfecting contaminated surfaces, and proper hand hygiene. These measures are effective in decreasing the transmission of the viruses responsible for HFMD.

Protective habits include hand washing and disinfecting surfaces in play areas. Breastfeeding has also been shown to decrease rates of severe HFMD, though it does not reduce the risk of the infection of the disease.

=== Vaccine ===
A vaccine known as the EV71 vaccine is available to prevent HFMD in China as of December 2015. No vaccine is currently available in the United States.

== Treatment ==
Medications are usually not needed as hand, foot, and mouth disease is a viral disease that typically resolves on its own. Currently, there is no specific curative treatment for hand, foot, and mouth disease. Disease management typically focuses on achieving symptomatic relief. Pain from the sores may be eased by using analgesic medications. Infection in older children, adolescents, and adults is typically mild and lasts approximately 1 week, but may occasionally run a longer course. Fever reducers can help decrease body temperature.

A minority of individuals with hand, foot, and mouth disease may require hospital admission due to complications such as inflammation of the brain, inflammation of the meninges, or acute flaccid paralysis. Non-neurologic complications such as inflammation of the heart, fluid in the lungs, or bleeding into the lungs may also occur.

== Complications ==
Complications from the viral infections that cause HFMD are rare but require immediate medical treatment if present. HFMD infections caused by Enterovirus 71 tend to be more severe and are more likely to have neurologic or cardiac complications including death than infections caused by Coxsackievirus A16. Viral or aseptic meningitis can occur with HFMD in rare cases and is characterized by fever, headache, stiff neck, or back pain. The condition is usually mild and resolves without treatment; however, a short hospitalization may be needed. Other serious complications of HFMD include encephalitis (inflammation of the brain), or flaccid paralysis in rare circumstances.

Fingernail and toenail loss have been reported in children 4–8 weeks after having HFMD. The relationship between HFMD and reported nail loss is unclear; however, it is temporary, and nail growth resumes without treatment.

Minor complications from symptoms can occur, such as dehydration, due to mouth sores causing discomfort with food and fluid intake.

== Epidemiology ==
Hand, foot, and mouth disease most commonly occurs in children under the age of 10 and more often under the age of 5, but it can also affect adults with varying symptoms. It tends to occur in outbreaks during spring, summer, and autumn seasons. This is believed to be due to heat and humidity improving the spread. HFMD is more common in rural areas than urban areas; however, socioeconomic status and hygiene levels need to be considered. Poor hygiene is a risk factor for HFMD.

=== Outbreaks ===
- In 1997, an outbreak occurred in Sarawak, Malaysia, with 600 cases and over 30 children died.
- In 1998, there was an outbreak in Taiwan, affecting mainly children. There were 405 severe complications, and 78 children died. The total number of cases in that epidemic is estimated to have been 1.5 million.
- In 2008 an outbreak in China, beginning in March in Fuyang, Anhui, led to 25,000 infections, and 42 deaths, by May 13. Similar outbreaks were reported in Singapore (more than 2,600 cases as of April 20, 2008), Vietnam (2,300 cases, 11 deaths), Mongolia (1,600 cases), and Brunei (1,053 cases from June–August 2008).
- In 2009 17 children died in an outbreak during March and April 2009 in China's eastern Shandong Province, and 18 children died in the neighboring Henan Province. Out of 115,000 reported cases in China from January to April, 773 were severe and 50 were fatal.
- In 2010, in China, an outbreak occurred in southern China's Guangxi Autonomous Region as well as Guangdong, Henan, Hebei, and Shandong provinces. Until March, 70,756 children were infected, and 40 died from the disease. By June, the peak season for the disease, 537 had died.
- The World Health Organization reporting between January and October 2011 (1,340,259) states the number of cases in China had dropped by approximately 300,000 from 2010 (1,654,866) cases, with new cases peaking in June. There were 437 deaths, down from 2010 (537 deaths).
- In December 2011, the California Department of Public Health identified a strong form of the virus, coxsackievirus A6 (CVA6), where nail loss in children is common.
- In 2012 in Alabama, United States, there was an outbreak of an unusual type of the disease. It occurred in a season when it is not usually seen and affected teenagers and older adults. There were some hospitalizations due to the disease, but no reported deaths.
- In 2012 in Cambodia, 52 of 59 reviewed cases of children reportedly dead (as of July 9, 2012) due to a mysterious disease were diagnosed to be caused by a virulent form of HFMD. Although a significant degree of uncertainty exists with reference to the diagnosis, the WHO report states, "Based on the latest laboratory results, a significant proportion of the samples tested positive for enterovirus 71 (EV-71), which causes hand foot and mouth disease (HFMD). The EV-71 virus has been known to generally cause severe complications amongst some patients."
- HFMD infected 1,520,274 people with up to 431 deaths reported at the end of July 2012 in China.
- In 2018, more than 50,000 cases occurred through a nationwide outbreak in Malaysia with two deaths also reported.

==== India 2022 ====
An outbreak of CVA-16 in Kerala, India occurred in 2022. It was sensationalised in the media as "tomato flu" or "tomato fever." No specific variant was found associated with the outbreak.

== History ==
HFMD cases were first described clinically in Canada and New Zealand in 1957. The disease was first named "hand-foot-and-mouth disease" by Alsop, Flewett and Foster after a similar outbreak was described in the British Medical Journal in 1960.

== Research ==
Novel antiviral agents to prevent and treat infection with the viruses responsible for HFMD are currently under development. Preliminary studies have shown inhibitors of the EV-71 viral capsid to have potent antiviral activity.
