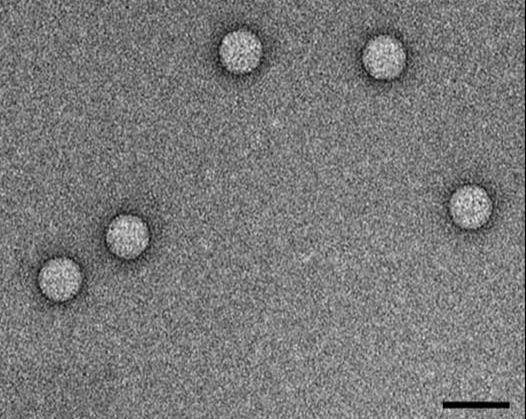
- TEM micrograph of Enterovirus A71 virions. Scale bar, 50 nm.

Virus classification
- (unranked): Virus
- Realm: Riboviria
- Kingdom: Orthornavirae
- Phylum: Pisuviricota
- Class: Pisoniviricetes
- Order: Picornavirales
- Family: Picornaviridae
- Genus: Enterovirus
- Species: Enterovirus A
- Serotype: Enterovirus A71

Synonyms
- Enterovirus 71 (EV71); Human rhinovirus A71; Human rhinovirus 71

= Enterovirus 71 =

Enterovirus A71

Species of virus

Enterovirus 71 (EV71), also known as Enterovirus A71 (EV-A71), is a virus of the genus Enterovirus in the Picornaviridae family, notable for its role in causing epidemics of severe neurological disease and hand, foot, and mouth disease in children. It was first isolated and characterized from cases of neurological disease in California in 1969. Enterovirus 71 infrequently causes polio-like syndrome permanent paralysis.

== Evolution ==
This virus is a member of the enterovirus species A. Species A was formerly assigned to the genus Rhinovirus. This virus appears to have evolved recently with the first known strain isolated in 1965. It was associated with an outbreak of neurological disease in the United States in 1969. It then spread to Europe with outbreaks there in Bulgaria (1975) and Hungary (1978). It has since spread to various Asian countries where it has been responsible for several outbreaks, most recently in Cambodia (2012).

The strains fall into six genogroups named A to F. Both the B and C genogroups have been subdivided into B0–B5 and C1–C5. The genogroup C appears to have evolved ~1970 while the A and B taxa evolved before. Genogroup D was identified in India only and genogroups E and F in Africa only. Phylogenetic studies performed on partial sequences of viruses from India suggest that additional genogroups exist.

An analysis of strains isolated in Europe (Austria, France, and Germany) showed that the clades C1b and C2b originated in 1994 (95% confidence interval 1992.7–1995.8) and 2002 (95% confidence interval 2001.6–2003.8), respectively.

Intra- and inter-typic recombination occur commonly in EV-A71 virus infections. Recombination can occur when at least two viral genomes are present in the same host cell. The mechanism of recombination likely involves strand switching by the RNA-dependent RNA polymerase (copy-choice recombination), a mechanism demonstrated in poliovirus. In addition to being a source of sequence diversity, recombination in RNA viruses appears to be an adaptation for repairing genome damage.

== Virology ==
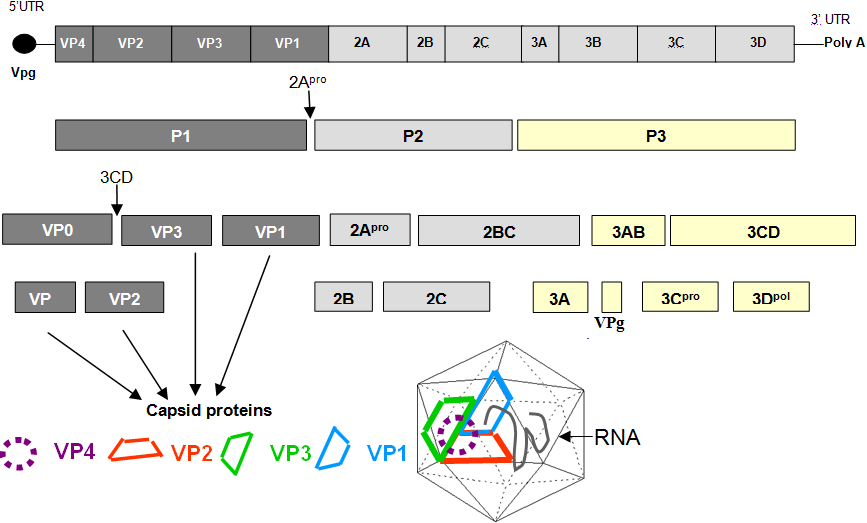
Enterovirus genome, polyprotein processing cascade, and architecture of enterovirus capsid.

The receptors for EV71 and CVA16 have been identified as P-selectin glycoprotein ligand-1 and scavenger receptor class B, member 2 (SCARB2); both are transmembrane proteins.

The basic reproductive number (R0) for enterovirus 71 (EV71) was estimated to a median of 5.48 with an interquartile range of 4.20 to 6.51.

== Treatment ==
There is no antiviral agent known to be effective in treating EV71 infection. However, Sinovac Biotech Ltd., a pharmaceutical company in China, conducted an experimental trial for an EV71 vaccination, which was completed in March 2013. In December 2015, the China Food and Drug Administration (CFDA) approved the first EV71 vaccine. The vaccine was administered to approximately 10,000 children between the ages of 6 and 35 months. Of the placebo group, there were 30 cases of hand, foot, and mouth disease (HFMD) reported, and 41 cases of any EV71-associated illness. This can be compared to only 3 cases of HFMD and eight cases of any EV71-related illness reported in the vaccine group. Participants were surveilled from day 56 until the end of the 14-month experiment period, in addition to checkups at months five, eight, eleven, and fourteen. Other experimental vaccines and antiviral agents are being researched. For example, "both bovine and human lactoferrins were found to be potent inhibitors of EV71 infection" and "ribavirin could be a potential anti-EV71 drug."

== Host–pathogen interactions ==
SSHHPS are short stretches of homologous host-pathogen sequences found in the protease cleavage sites in the viral polyprotein. PHI-BLAST can be used to search the human proteome for predicted viral protease cleavage sites. Cleavage of host proteins by viral proteases is a type of co- or post-translational silencing. The targets of the viral proteases have been related to innate immunity and the virus-induced phenotype (symptoms). The predicted SSHHPS for EV-71 include targets related to the blood-brain barrier (BBB) such as ADGRA2, cell-fate determination, long QT syndrome, encephalopathy, spinocerebellar ataxia, neurodevelopmental disorders, deafness, among others. SSHHPS has been predicted.

== Research ==
A joint UK and Chinese team working at the UK's national synchrotron facility near Oxford determined the structure of EV71 in 2012. Researchers observed movements resembling breathing in the virus and found that this accompanied the infection process, together with a small molecule picked up from the body's cells and used to switch states. This particular molecule must be discarded to start an infection, and new research will be aimed at creating a synthetic replica that would bond strongly to the virus and stop the infection process.

== Outbreaks ==
=== Australia ===
In June 2013, an outbreak of four cases was noted in Sydney. Approximately 100 more children are believed to have been infected, and a panel of doctors monitored the situation.

=== Cambodia ===
From April through July 2012, at least 64 children died and two survived from a disease affecting children under 7 years old in Cambodia. Most died within 24 hours and had exhibited symptoms including respiratory illnesses, fever, and generalized neurological abnormalities. An initial sampling taken from 24 patients found that 15 tested positive for EV71 on July 6, 2012. The World Health Organization noted that the cause of the outbreak has not been fully solved and that more analysis was needed.

On 15 July 2012, it was announced that no further cases had been noted in Cambodia, and that the deaths were a result of a combination of infections with EV 71, dengue fever, and Streptococcus suis. and the use of steroids in the treatment of the infections.

=== China ===
HFMD was recognized in China in the 1980s, and EV71 was first isolated in China from HFMD vesicle fluid in 1987 by Zhi-Ming Zheng at Virus Research Institute, Hubei Medical University. From 1999 to 2004, there were no epidemics of hand, foot, and mouth disease in Shenzhen, People's Republic of China, but each year there were small, local outbreaks associated with only a few cases of neurological disease and no reported fatalities. Genetic analysis revealed 19 cases of EV71 among 147 children who had hand, foot, and mouth disease in Shenzhen during this time. Until 2008, no large EV71 epidemic had been reported in mainland China, but sporadic infections were common in the southeast coastal area as well as in inland regions, such as Beijing, Chongqing, and Jinan. From 1998 to 2004, the only EV71 viruses identified on mainland China belonged to the genotype C4, indicating far less variety in China than in Taiwan.

On May 3, 2008, Chinese health authorities reported a major outbreak of EV71 enterovirus in Fuyang City and other localities in Anhui, Zhejiang, and Guangdong provinces. As of May 3, 2008, 3736 cases occurring mainly in children were reported, with 22 dead and 42 critically ill. Some 415 new cases were reported in 24 hours in Fuyang City alone. As of May 5, 2008, 6,300 were sickened by the viral outbreak which killed another child in Zhejiang, raising the death toll to 26 children, with 1,198 other children affected in that province alone.

Specifically, an additional 5,151 cases were reported in Anhui province, with scores more in 4 other provinces. 8,531 cases of children infected with hand-foot-mouth disease (HFMD) were reported in China. All the children infected were aged below 6, with most of them being under 2. As of May 7, contagious HFMD had led to 28 deaths. Xinhua reported the number of people infected also rose from 4,000 to 15,799.

=== Taiwan ===
Enteroviruses were isolated from a total of 1,892 patients in this laboratory during this period. Of the virus isolates, enterovirus 71 (EV71) was diagnosed in 44.4% of the patients (132 of 297) in 1998, 2% (13 of 646) in 1999, and 20.5% (195 of 949) in 2000. Genetic analyses of the 5′-untranslated and VP1 regions of EV71 isolates by reverse transcription-PCR and sequencing were performed to understand the diversity of EV71 in these outbreaks of HFMD. Most EV71 isolates from the 1998 epidemic belonged to genotype C, while only one-tenth of the isolates were genotype B. All EV71 isolates tested from 1999 to 2000 belonged to genotype B. This study indicated that two genogroups of EV71 capable of inducing severe clinical illness have been circulating in Taiwan. Furthermore, the predominant EV71 genotypes responsible for the two major HFMD outbreaks within the 3 years in Taiwan were different.

Significant outbreaks of Enterovirus 71 (EV71) occurred in 1998, 2000, and 2001 with 78 deaths in 1998, 25 in 2000, and 26 in 2001. There are two patterns observed in outbreaks of the virus where they may be small with occasional cases resulting in death or they are severe with a high fatality rate. The 1998 outbreak came in two waves to Taiwan. The first wave reached its peak of fatalities in the week of June 7 with cases in all four regions of Taiwan. There were approximately 405 severe cases and 91% of fatal cases were children under the age of five. After further investigation into the fatalities among children 16% were six months or younger, 43% were from seven to twelve months meaning it was more fatal for children under the age of one. 65 out of 78 patients died from pulmonary edema or haemorrhage making it the most lethal effect which results from the virus. The second wave occurred in the week of October 4 and had fewer cases that were more confined to Southern Taiwan. The total number of cases of Hand Foot and Mouth Disease (HFMD) and herpangina in Taiwan was 129,106.

=== Development and detection ===
The outbreaks of Enterovirus 71 in Taiwan and the number of cases and fatalities that resulted became an indication of the significance of the threat of the virus. New anti-viral drugs should be developed and vaccination of children under five years old should be considered in areas where the virus is more susceptive. In July 1989 a sentinel surveillance system for infectious diseases was established in Taiwan by Disease, Surveillance and Quarantine Service, Ministry of Health of Taiwan. The sentinel surveillance system is physician-based and has approximately 850 Taiwanese physicians participating from various regions all over Taiwan. Public health officers contact physicians on a weekly basis to collect disease information and on the occasion when there is a suspected outbreak of an infectious disease they are responsible for public notification. After the observed outbreak of HFMD and herpangina in Malaysia in 1997, they were included in the detection system.

In March 1998, under the sentinel surveillance system, it was noticed that there was an increasing number of HFMD cases and herpangina in Taiwan. By the end of April that year, the number of cases involving children with HFMD had increased significantly. Due to the presence of a possible threat of an epidemic a warning was released on May 12 for the virus and preventative measures were advised to the public such as practicing better hygiene and isolating infected children. Although public notification had been given and preventatives taken, the number of HFMD cases continued to rise. On May 29 another reporting system, based on hospitals rather than just physicians, was developed in response to this where all severe and fatal cases were more carefully monitored from 597 hospitals and medical centres.

The exact reasons behind the outbreaks are hard to and yet to be defined however through the reporting systems developed, detection of the virus is of large significance and gives way for further study and investigation. Possible reasons behind the developments of the outbreaks are that the virus may have mutated with increased virulence made it more easily contractible or that the population and genetics became more susceptible to contraction of the disease. Studies for serial serum antibody titers to the Enterovirus 71 in blood samples taken yearly from 81 children born in 1988 was conducted from 1989 to 1994 and 1997 to 1999. They discovered an increase in EV71 seroconversion (increased susceptibility to the disease) from 3% to 11% from 1989 to 1997 and by 1997 68% of the children had evidence of being infected by the virus. The virus was also evident in HFMD patients from as early on as 1981. Other studies conducted in early 1999 showed that half the adult population of Taiwan had antibodies against the enterovirus 71 prior to the 1998 outbreak meaning the population of children was more susceptible to the virus. It is possible that prior to the outbreak in 1998, there were severe and fatal cases that went unrecognised as EV71 cases in children who died of unexplained illnesses and studies are still ongoing.

=== Vietnam ===
Vietnam recorded 63,780 cases of hand, foot, and mouth disease in the first seven months of 2012. According to Tran Minh Dien, vice director of the National Hospital for Children, about 58.7% percent were caused by EV71.

== See also ==
- Enterovirus 68, a similar, related virus also first isolated in California in the 1960s
- Herpangina, mouth blisters that can be caused by enteroviruses
