= Half and half nail =

Half and half nails
- Other names: Lindsay's nails
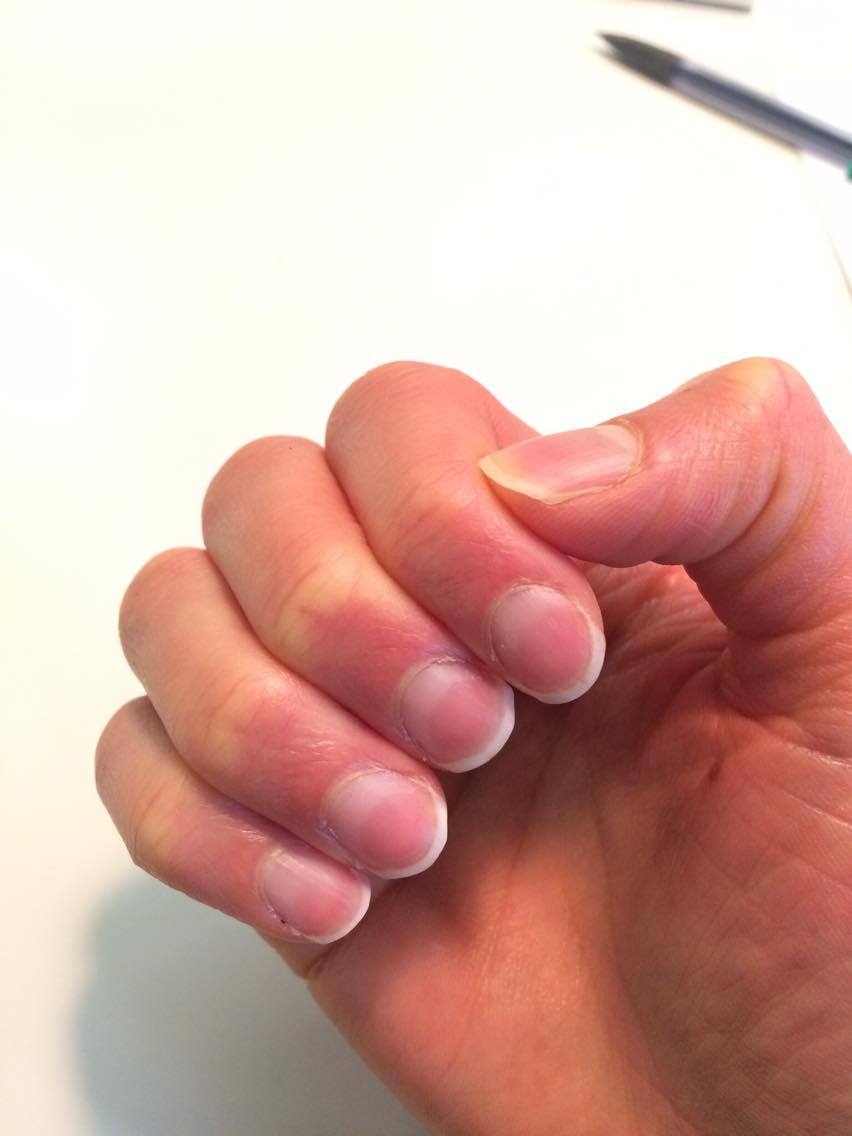
- Half and half nails
- Specialty: Internal medicine, Dermatology
- Causes: increased β-MSH
- Risk factors: hemodialysis, renal transplant
- Diagnostic method: Physical examination
- Differential diagnosis: Terry's nails

Half and half nails (also known as "Lindsay's nails") show the proximal portion of the nail white and the distal half red, pink, or brown, with a sharp line of demarcation between the two halves. The darker distal discoloration does not fade on pressure, which differentiates Lindsay's nails from Terry's nails. The discoloration is thought to be due to β-melanocyte–stimulating hormone. Seventy percent of hemodialysis patients and 56% of renal transplant patients have at least one type of nail abnormality. Absence of lunula, splinter hemorrhage, and half and half nails were significantly more common in hemodialysis patients, while leukonychia was significantly more common in transplant patients.

== Signs and symptoms ==
Half and half nail is when the distal portion of the nail is reddish brown, while the proximal area is white.

== Causes ==
Half and half nail is seen in 15–50% of chronic renal failure patients. It has also been associated with yellow nail syndrome, hyperthyroidism, pellagra, HIV infection, Crohn's disease, Kawasaki's disease, Behcet's disease, cirrhosis, and even in healthy individuals.

== Treatment ==
As the symptom itself is benign from the medical point of view, treatment is limited to cosmetic measures.

== See also ==
- List of cutaneous conditions
