= Terry's nails =

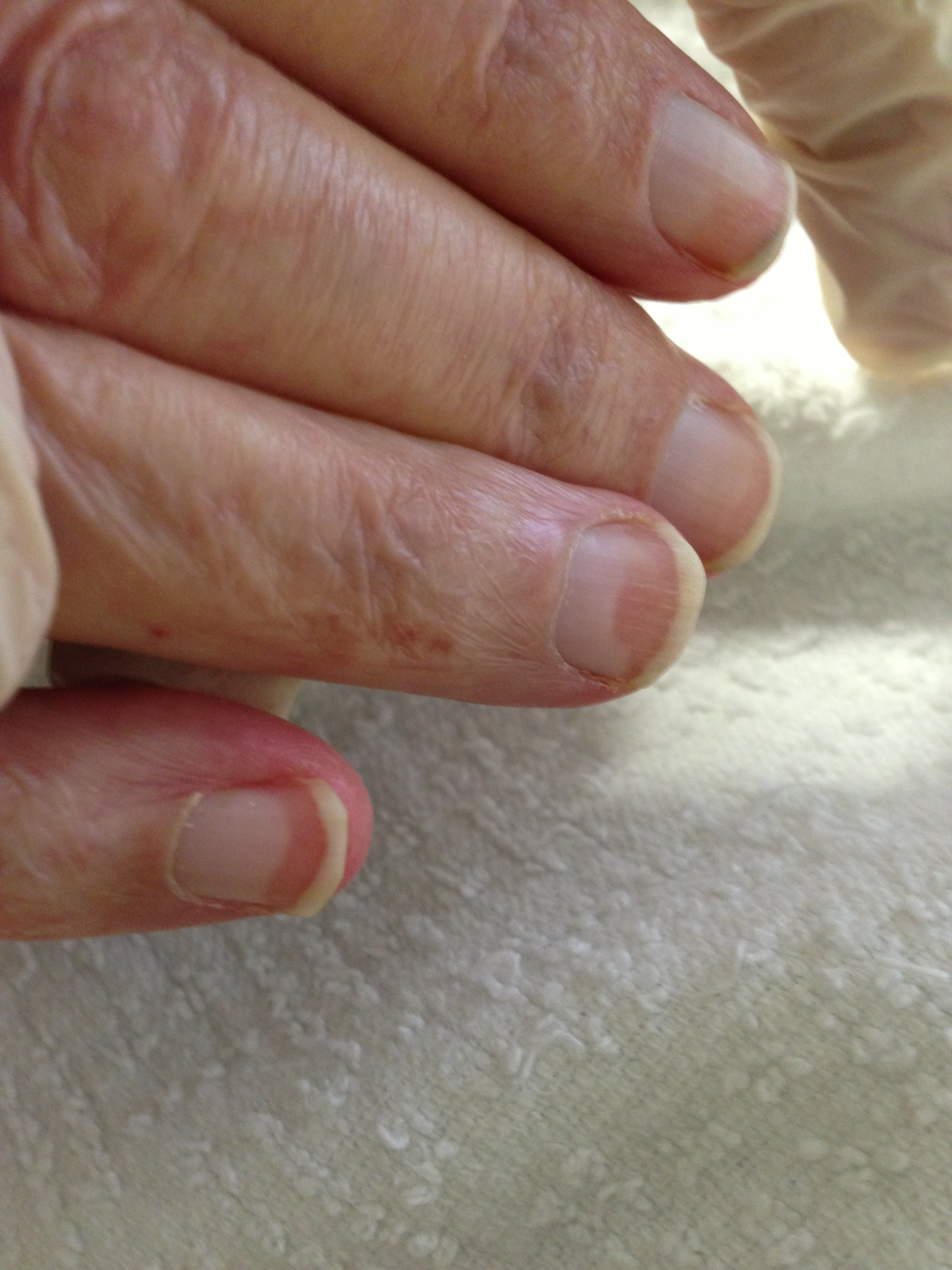
- Terry's nails
- Specialty: Internal medicine, Dermatology
- Causes: changes in vascularity and connective tissue of nail bed
- Risk factors: Liver failure, cirrhosis, diabetes mellitus, congestive heart failure, hyperthyroidism, or malnutrition
- Diagnostic method: Physical examination
- Differential diagnosis: Lindsay's nails
- Treatment: Directed at underlying condition

Terry's nails is a physical condition in which a person's fingernails or toenails appear white with a characteristic "ground glass" appearance without any lunula. The condition is thought to be due to a decrease in vascularity and an increase in connective tissue within the nail bed; the darker shade of the distal portion of the nail fades upon pressure, which differentiates Terry's nails from Lindsay's nails. It frequently occurs in the setting of liver failure, cirrhosis, diabetes mellitus, congestive heart failure, hyperthyroidism, or malnutrition. Eighty percent of patients with severe liver disease have Terry's nails, but they are also found in people with kidney failure, in patients with congestive heart failure and are described as a brown arc near the ends of the nails. The recognition of characteristic nail patterns, such as Terry's nails, may be a helpful herald for early diagnosis of systemic diseases. This finding was named for Richard Terry.

== See also ==
- List of cutaneous conditions
