= Lipki =

Lipki may refer to:

- Lipki, Łódź Voivodeship, a village in central Poland
- Lipki, Opole Voivodeship, a village in southwestern Poland
- Lipki, Chojnice County, a village in northern Poland
- Lipki, Malbork County, a village in northern Poland
- Lipki, West Pomeranian Voivodeship, a village in northwestern Poland
- Lipki Urban Settlement, a municipal formation which Lipki Town Under District Jurisdiction in Kireyevsky District of Tula Oblast, Russia is incorporated as
- Lipki, Russia, several inhabited localities in Russia
- Lipka Tatars

== See also ==
- Lipka (disambiguation)
- Lipkin
