= Lipkin =

Lipkin (Hebrew: ליפקין, Russian: Липкин) is a surname. Russian-language feminine: Lipkina. Notable people with the surname include:

- Amnon Lipkin-Shahak (1944–2012), Israeli military officer
- Harry J. Lipkin (1921–2015), Israeli theoretical physicist
- Heather Slade-Lipkin (1947–2017), English pianist, harpsichordist and teacher
- Janet Lipkin (born 1948), American clothing designer, visual artist, and educator
- Malcolm Lipkin (1932–2017), English composer
- Miles Jackson-Lipkin (1924–2012), British jurist
- Nikolay Lipkin (born 1985), Russian canoeist
- Pamela Lipkin (born 1952), American plastic surgeon
- Semyon Lipkin (1911–2003), Russian writer and poet
- Seymour Lipkin (1927–2015), American pianist, conductor and teacher
- Simon Lipkin (born 1986), British thespian
- Steven Barry Lipkin (born 1942), American songwriter and record producer
- W. Ian Lipkin (born 1952), American epidemiologist
- Yisrael Lipkin Salanter (1809–1883), Lithuanian rabbi
- Yom Tov Lipman Lipkin (1846–1876), Lithuanian mathematician, inventor of Peaucellier–Lipkin linkage, son of Yisrael

== See also ==
- Lipkind
- Lipki (disambiguation)
