= Lipkind =

Lipkind is a surname. Notable people with the surname include:

- Emmanuil Lipkind (1928–2007), Russian-Israeli painter
- Gavriel Lipkind (born 1977), Israeli classical cellist
- Goodman Lipkind (1878–1973), rabbi
- William Lipkind (1904–1974), American writer

== See also ==
- Lipkin
