= Lipka =

Lipka (a diminutive form of Polish lipa, meaning "lime tree" (also called linden tree or basswood in North America and different from the citrus lime tree) may refer to:

== Places ==
=== Poland ===
- Gmina Lipka, an administrative district) in Złotów County, Greater Poland Voivodeship (west-central Poland)
- Lipka, Złotów County, seat of Gmina Lipka
- Lipka, Lower Silesian Voivodeship (south-west Poland)
- Lipka, Łódź Voivodeship (central Poland)
- Lipka, Lublin Voivodeship (east Poland)
- Lipka, Masovian Voivodeship (east-central Poland)
- Lipka, Kalisz County in Greater Poland Voivodeship (west-central Poland)
- Lipka, Lubusz Voivodeship (west Poland)
- Lipka, Pomeranian Voivodeship (north Poland)
- Lipka, West Pomeranian Voivodeship (north-west Poland)
- Lipka, an alternative name for Dłusko Leśne, a hamlet in Gryfino County, West Pomeranian, Poland

=== Other countries ===
- Lipka, a hamlet of Horní Bradlo, Pardubice Region, Czech Republic

== Other uses ==
- Lipka (surname)
- Lipka (grape), another name for the German wine grape Riesling
- Lipka Tatars
