= Lipki, Russia =

Lipki (Russian: Липки) is the name of several inhabited localities in Russia.

== Modern localities ==
Urban localities

- Lipki, Kireyevsky District, Tula Oblast, a town in Kireyevsky District of Tula Oblast

Rural localities

- Lipki, Mglinsky District, Bryansk Oblast, a settlement in Oskolkovsky Rural Administrative Okrug of Mglinsky District in Bryansk Oblast; 53°6′N 32°59′E
- Lipki, Navlinsky District, Bryansk Oblast, a village under the administrative jurisdiction of Navlintsky Settlement Administrative Okrug in Navlinsky District of Bryansk Oblast; 52°50′N 34°25′E
- Lipki, Pochepsky District, Bryansk Oblast, a settlement in Dmitrovsky Rural Administrative Okrug of Pochepsky District in Bryansk Oblast; 53°2′N 33°39′E
- Lipki, Unechsky District, Bryansk Oblast, a village in Pavlovsky Rural Administrative Okrug of Unechsky District in Bryansk Oblast; 52°53′N 32°50′E
- Lipki, Kaliningrad Oblast, a settlement in Novostroyevsky Rural Okrug of Ozyorsky District in Kaliningrad Oblast
- Lipki, Leningrad Oblast, a village under the administrative jurisdiction of Lyubanskoye Settlement Municipal Formation in Tosnensky District of Leningrad Oblast
- Lipki, Republic of Mordovia, a settlement in Lipkinsky Selsoviet of Romodanovsky District in the Republic of Mordovia
- Lipki, Moscow Oblast, a village in Yershovskoye Rural Settlement of Odintsovsky District in Moscow Oblast
- Lipki, Oryol Oblast, a village in Bolshekulikovsky Selsoviet of Orlovsky District in Oryol Oblast
- Lipki, Pskov Oblast, a village in Pskovsky District of Pskov Oblast
- Lipki, Sasovsky District, Ryazan Oblast, a settlement in Saltykovsky Rural Okrug of Sasovsky District in Ryazan Oblast
- Lipki, Zakharovsky District, Ryazan Oblast, a selo in Dobro-Pchelsky Rural Okrug of Zakharovsky District in Ryazan Oblast
- Lipki, Dukhovshchinsky District, Smolensk Oblast, a village in Dobrinskoye Rural Settlement of Dukhovshchinsky District in Smolensk Oblast
- Lipki, Pochinkovsky District, Smolensk Oblast, a village in Dankovskoye Rural Settlement of Pochinkovsky District in Smolensk Oblast
- Lipki, Sychyovsky District, Smolensk Oblast, a village in Bekhteyevskoye Rural Settlement of Sychyovsky District in Smolensk Oblast
- Lipki, Berezovsky Rural Okrug, Kireyevsky District, Tula Oblast, a village in Berezovsky Rural Okrug of Kireyevsky District in Tula Oblast
- Lipki, Leninsky District, Tula Oblast, a village in Oktyabrsky Rural Okrug of Leninsky District in Tula Oblast
- Lipki, Odoyevsky District, Tula Oblast, a village in Stoyanovskaya Rural Administration of Odoyevsky District in Tula Oblast
- Lipki, Tver Oblast, a village in Ponizovskoye Rural Settlement of Toropetsky District in Tver Oblast
- Lipki, Ulyanovsk Oblast, a settlement under the administrative jurisdiction of the town of oblast significance of Novoulyanovsk in Ulyanovsk Oblast
- Lipki, Vladimir Oblast, an area in Vyaznikovsky District of Vladimir Oblast
- Lipki, Yaroslavl Oblast, a village in Nikolo-Kormsky Rural Okrug of Rybinsky District in Yaroslavl Oblast

== Abolished localities ==
- Lipki, Moscow, a rural locality (a settlement) in Yuzhnoye Butovo District of the federal city of Moscow; abolished in July 2012
