= VirCapSeq =

VirCapSeq is a system to broadly screen for all viral infections in vertebrates including humans. It was designed by W. Ian Lipkin, Thomas Briese, and Amit Kapoor at Columbia University.

The researchers created a library of 2 million 50 to 100-mer oligonucleotides based on viral genome sequences described in the European Molecular Biology Laboratory database that represented the coding sequences of all known vertebrate viruses. They then developed an assay whereby addition of these probes to samples allowed recovery of complete viral genomic sequences, This assay is "VirCapSeq".
