= Contagion (2011 film) =

2011 medical disaster film by Steven Soderbergh

- Theatrical release poster
- Directed by: Steven Soderbergh
- Written by: Scott Z. Burns
- Produced by: Michael Shamberg; Stacey Sher; Gregory Jacobs
- Starring: Marion Cotillard; Matt Damon; Laurence Fishburne; Jude Law; Gwyneth Paltrow; Kate Winslet; Bryan Cranston; Jennifer Ehle; Sanaa Lathan
- Cinematography: Peter Andrews
- Edited by: Stephen Mirrione
- Music by: Cliff Martinez
- Production companies: Participant Media; Imagenation Abu Dhabi; Double Feature Films
- Distributed by: Warner Bros. Pictures
- Release dates: September 3, 2011 (Venice); September 9, 2011 (United States)
- Running time: 106 minutes
- Country: United States
- Language: English
- Budget: $60 million
- Box office: $136.5 million

Contagion is a 2011 American medical pandemic thriller film directed by Steven Soderbergh from a screenplay by Scott Z. Burns. Its ensemble cast includes Matt Damon, Laurence Fishburne, Jude Law, Marion Cotillard, Kate Winslet, and Gwyneth Paltrow. The plot concerns the spread of a highly contagious virus transmitted through respiratory droplets and fomites, attempts by medical researchers and public health officials to identify and contain the disease, the loss of social order as the virus turns into a worldwide pandemic, and the introduction of a vaccine to halt its spread. To follow several interacting plot lines, the film makes use of the multi-narrative "hyperlink cinema" style, popularized in several of Soderbergh's films. The film was inspired by real-life outbreaks such as the 2002–2004 SARS outbreak and the 2009 flu pandemic.

Following their collaboration on The Informant! (2009), Soderbergh and Burns discussed a film depicting the rapid spread of a virus. Burns consulted with representatives of the World Health Organization as well as medical experts such as W. Ian Lipkin and Larry Brilliant. Principal photography started in Hong Kong in September 2010, and continued in Chicago, Atlanta, London, Dublin, Geneva, and San Francisco Bay Area until February 2011.

Contagion premiered at the 68th Venice International Film Festival on September 3, 2011, and was theatrically released by Warner Bros. Pictures on September 9, 2011. Commercially, the film made $136.5 million against its $60 million production budget. Critics praised it for its narrative and the performances, as did scientists for its accuracy. The film received renewed popularity in 2020 due to the emergence of the COVID-19 pandemic.

== Plot ==
Returning from a Hong Kong business trip, Beth Emhoff meets up with a former lover during a Chicago layover. She feels slightly ill; two days later, back home in Minneapolis, she suffers a seizure and dies from an unknown illness. Her 6-year-old son, Clark, also dies. Beth's husband, Mitch, is isolated but found to be naturally immune. After being released, he quarantines with his teenage daughter, Jory, at home.

In Atlanta, Department of Homeland Security representatives meet with Dr. Ellis Cheever of the Centers for Disease Control and Prevention (CDC) over concerns that the disease may be a bioweapon. He dispatches Dr. Erin Mears, an Epidemic Intelligence Service officer, to Minneapolis, where she traces everyone having had contact with Beth. She negotiates with reluctant local bureaucrats to commit resources for a public health response. Later, Mears becomes infected and dies, and is buried in a mass grave. As the novel virus spreads, citywide quarantine orders cause panic buying, widespread looting, and violence.

At the CDC, Dr. Ally Hextall determines the virus is a combination of genetic material from pig and bat-borne viruses. Scientists are unable to discover a cell culture to grow the newly identified MEV-1 (Meningoencephalitis Virus 1). Cheever determines the virus too virulent to be researched at Biosafety level (BSL) 3 laboratories and restricts all work to BSL 4 labs only. Hextall orders University of California, San Francisco, researcher Dr. Ian Sussman to destroy his samples. Believing he is close to finding a viable cell culture, Sussman secretly continues his research and identifies a usable cell culture from which Hextall develops a vaccine. Scientists determine MEV-1 is spread by respiratory droplets and fomites, with a basic reproduction number of four when the virus mutates; they project that 1 in 12 people on Earth will be infected, with a 25–30% mortality rate.

Conspiracy theorist Alan Krumwiede claims he cured himself of the virus using a homeopathic cure derived from forsythia. People seeking forsythia violently overwhelm pharmacies. Krumwiede, having faked being infected to boost forsythia sales, is arrested for conspiracy and securities fraud, though his fanbase immediately bails him out. Meanwhile, Hextall inoculates herself with the experimental vaccine and then visits her infected father. She does not contract MEV-1, and the vaccine is declared successful. The CDC awards vaccinations by lottery based on birthdates. By this time, the death toll has reached 2.5 million in the U.S. and 26 million worldwide.

Earlier in Hong Kong, World Health Organization (WHO) epidemiologist Dr. Leonora Orantes and public health officials comb through CCTV footage of Beth's contacts in a Macau casino and identify her as the index case. Government official Sun Feng, believing the US has secretly developed a vaccine, kidnaps and holds Orantes for months as leverage to obtain the first vaccines for his village. WHO officials provide the village with fake vaccines, and Orantes is released. Learning the vaccines were placebos, Orantes goes to warn the village. Meanwhile, life begins to return to normal, with public venues accessible for those with a vaccine bracelet.

In a flashback to the spillover event, a bulldozer from Beth's company clears a tree in China, disturbing a bat colony. One bat takes shelter in a pig farm and drops a piece of infected banana, which is consumed by one of the pigs. The pig is in turn slaughtered and prepared by a chef in a Macau casino, who, without washing his hands, transmits the virus to Beth via a handshake.

== Cast ==
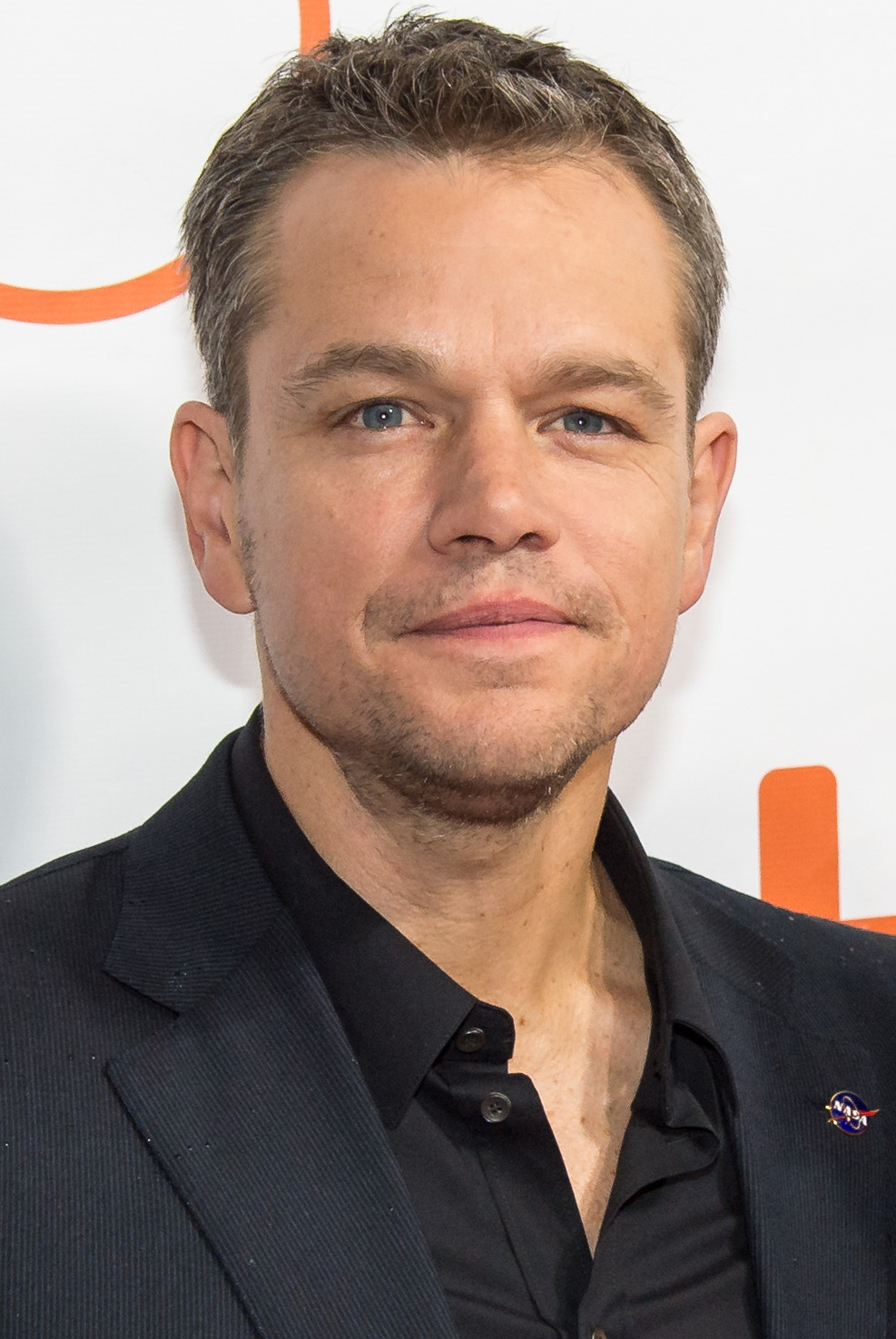
Matt Damon, a frequent collaborator of Soderbergh's, portrays Mitch Emhoff.

- Matt Damon as Mitch Emhoff

Damon viewed his character as the embodiment of the "everyman"—an individual who is seen as one of the human faces of the supervirus following his wife and stepson's deaths. Soderbergh also noted Mitch's "common individual" lack of medical and scientific knowledge, though keeping the situation dynamic and compelling was challenging for the director, as he was concerned that Emhoff would be a one-dimensional character. Soderbergh felt that Damon understood the concept and addressed the producers' concerns. "You never catch him acting", said Soderbergh. "There's no vanity, no self-consciousness in his performance; it's as if the cameras aren't there." Writer Scott Z. Burns sent him a copy of the script with a "read this and then go wash your hands" note attached to it. Damon recalled: "I just really want to be in this movie. It was a terrific, riveting, really fast read and really exciting and really horrifying, but managed to be really touching."

- Laurence Fishburne as Dr. Ellis Cheever

Soderbergh admired Fishburne's ability to portray an emphatic and assertive figure in previous films. To Fishburne, Cheever was a "smart", "competent" physician who often epitomized a "voice of reason". Once he conferred with W. Ian Lipkin, a virologist and professor at Columbia University, the character's complexities were nonexistent for the actor. Fishburne stated, "The personal stuff that I have as Ellis Cheever was telling my fiancée, soon-to-be wife, Sanaa Lathan, to get out of town, to leave, to pack up, to not talk. That's really easy. Any human being in that situation is going to do that, I think."

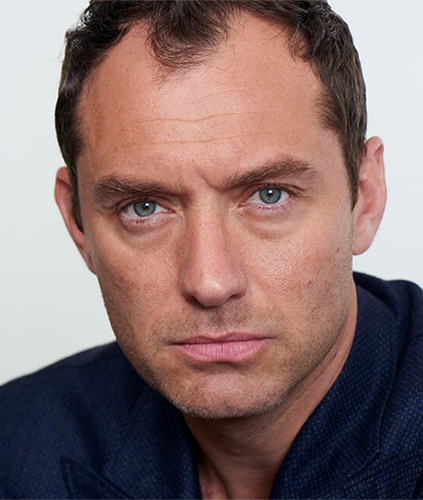
Although the conspiracy theorist Alan Krumwiede (played by Jude Law) appears to be an antagonist, producer Gregory Jacobs thinks that "in [a] sense [he also] represents the audience's point of view."

- Jude Law as Alan Krumwiede

Krumwiede is an ardent conspiracy theorist who, according to Law, is the so-called index patient for "what becomes a parallel epidemic of fear and panic". "We definitely wanted him to have a messianic streak", said Soderbergh, whom Law talked to during the character's creating process. The two men discussed the appearances and the behaviors of a typical anti-government conspiracy theorist. Producer Gregory Jacobs commented that "what's interesting is that you're not really sure about him. Is the government really hiding something and does the herbal remedy he's talking about really work? I think we all suspect at one time or another that we're not getting the whole truth, and in that sense, Krumwiede represents the audience's point of view."

- Gwyneth Paltrow as Beth Emhoff

A "working mom", as described by Paltrow, Beth is the central figure in the detective process. Despite being among the virus' first victims, Paltrow believed that Beth was "lucky" as she thought the disease's survivors were being left to deal with the newly difficult conditions of everyday life, such as finding food and potable water. When on location in Hong Kong, Paltrow was instructed by Soderbergh to take photographs to be used in the film and admitted she was apprehensive about the assignment. "I was just another tourist taking pictures", she said, and added, "I did feel a little pressure. When Steven Soderbergh gives you a photo assignment, you had better come back with something decent."

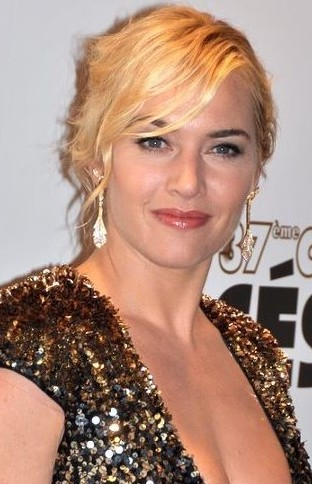
Kate Winslet researched her character at the Centers for Disease Control and Prevention.

- Kate Winslet as Dr. Erin Mears, an Epidemic Intelligence Service officer

In researching her character, Winslet traveled to the Centers for Disease Control and Prevention (CDC), currently in Atlanta, Georgia, where she consulted with current and former officers of the Epidemic Intelligence Service to receive insight on not only the daily life but on the type of person qualified for the occupation. "These are people who can be sent into war zones where there's been an outbreak of a new virus. Fear is not an option. If they feel it, they learn to push it aside." Winslet felt that Mears was able to bring the epidemic "down to the layman's level" so the viewer could comprehend the scope of it without the science dragging the story down.

- Bryan Cranston as Rear Admiral Lyle Haggerty, United States Public Health Service Commissioned Corps
- Jennifer Ehle as Dr. Ally Hextall, a research scientist with the Centers for Disease Control and Prevention

Soderbergh had seen Ehle's performance in Michael Clayton (2007), though it was ultimately cut prior to the film's release, and it prompted him to offer her a role in Contagion. He "had known who Jennifer was for a long time, and this didn't take a lot of thought, honestly".

- Elliott Gould as Dr. Ian Sussman, a scientist at the University of California San Francisco
- Chin Han as Sun Feng

Han spoke of his character's development: "He starts off as a button-down, serious ... government official, and then as the movie progresses ... you find out a different side of him and his secret agenda."

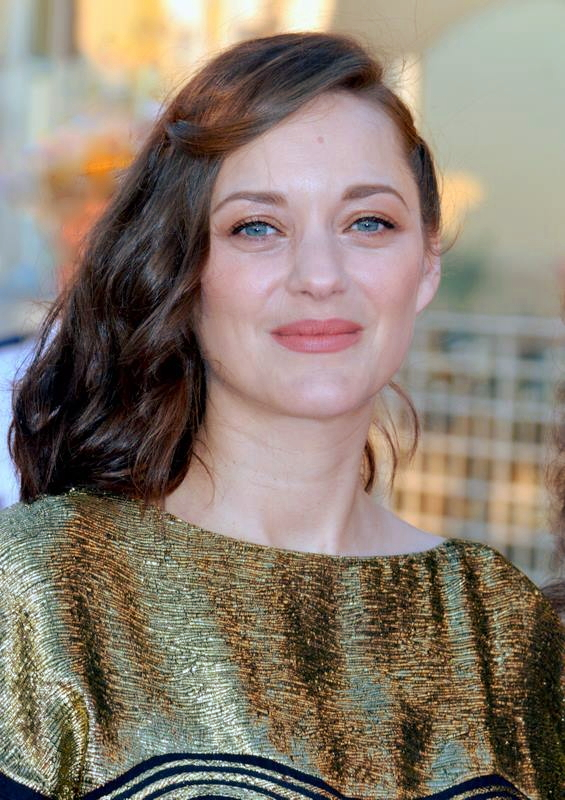
Marion Cotillard was enthusiastic in joining the project due to her fear of diseases.

- Marion Cotillard as Dr. Leonora Orantes, an epidemiologist with the World Health Organization

Orantes' main objective is to trace the origins of the MEV-1 pathogen. Cotillard, a fan of Soderbergh's work, first met with the director in Los Angeles, California. The French actress was enthralled with the script because she was "very concerned about germs. I've always been ... scared, in a way, by all of those disease[s]. So ... it was really something I was really interested." Soderbergh said that Orantes "gets dropped into situations and has to deal with cultural as well as scientific issues that are sometimes at odds", and notes that she has a "professional" yet stubborn, "remote", and "dispassionate" demeanor, though "something happens to her in the course of the story that causes a significant emotional shift."

Additionally, the film also stars John Hawkes as Roger, CDC custodian and acquaintance of Dr. Cheever; Anna Jacoby-Heron as Jory Emhoff, daughter of Mitch Emhoff; Josie Ho as the sister of Li Fai, who was the first to be infected with MEV-1 in Hong Kong; Sanaa Lathan as Aubrey Cheever, initially fiancee/later wife of Dr. Cheever; Demetri Martin as Dr. David Eisenberg, CDC colleague of Dr. Hextall; Armin Rohde as Damian Leopold, a WHO official; Enrico Colantoni as Dennis French, a Department of Homeland Security official; Larry Clarke as Dave, a Minnesota health official working with Dr. Mears; and Monique Gabriela Curnen as Lorraine Vasquez, a print journalist for the San Francisco Chronicle.

== Production ==
=== Conception and writing ===
There's a scene in The Informant! where Matt (Damon) is watching Scott Bakula's character talk on the phone and Scott coughs on the phone, and there's this whole ramp [sic] that Matt goes off on of Oh, great, now what happens? He gets sick and then I'm going to get it, my kids are going to get it." I've always been fascinated by transmissibility, so I said to Steven, "I want to do an interesting thriller version of a pandemic movie" and he said, Great! Let's do that instead."

— Scott Z. Burns

Story development for Contagion coincided with Scott Z. Burns' collaboration with Steven Soderbergh in The Informant! (2009). The duo had initially planned to create a biographical film on Leni Riefenstahl, a trailblazer in German cinema during the 1930s and a figure in the rise of the Nazi Party. Soderbergh later contacted Burns to cancel the project, as he thought that a film about Riefenstahl would struggle to attract an audience. Intrigued with the field of transmission, Burns suggested that they instead create a film that centered on a pandemic situation—"an interesting thriller version of a pandemic movie". His main objective was to construct a medical thriller that "really felt like what could happen".

Burns consulted with Larry Brilliant, renowned for his work in eradicating smallpox, to develop an accurate perception of a pandemic event. He had seen one of Brilliant's TED presentations, which he was fascinated by, and realized that "the point of view of people within that field isn't 'If this is going to happen', it's 'When is this going to happen?'" Brilliant introduced Burns to epidemiologist W. Ian Lipkin. With the aid of these physicians, the producers were able to obtain additional perspectives from representatives of the World Health Organization. Burns also met with the author of The Coming Plague, Laurie Garrett. Her 1995 book helped Burns consider a variety of potential plots for the film. He wanted to feature an official from the CDC, and ultimately decided to use an epidemiologist, since that role requires interacting with people while tracking the disease.

Although he had done research on pandemics six months prior to the 2009 flu pandemic, that outbreak enhanced his understanding of the societal apparatus that responds during the onset stages of a pandemic. To him, it was not solely the virus itself that one had to be concerned about, but how society handles the situation. "I saw them come to life", Burns said, "and I saw issues about, 'Well, do you close the schools and if you close the schools, then who stays home with the kids? And will everyone keep their kids at home?' Things happening online, which is where the Jude Law character came from, that there's going to be information that comes out online where people want to be ahead of the curve, so some people will write things about anti-virals or different treatment protocols, and so there's always going to be an information and that information also has sort of a viral pulse."

=== Filming ===
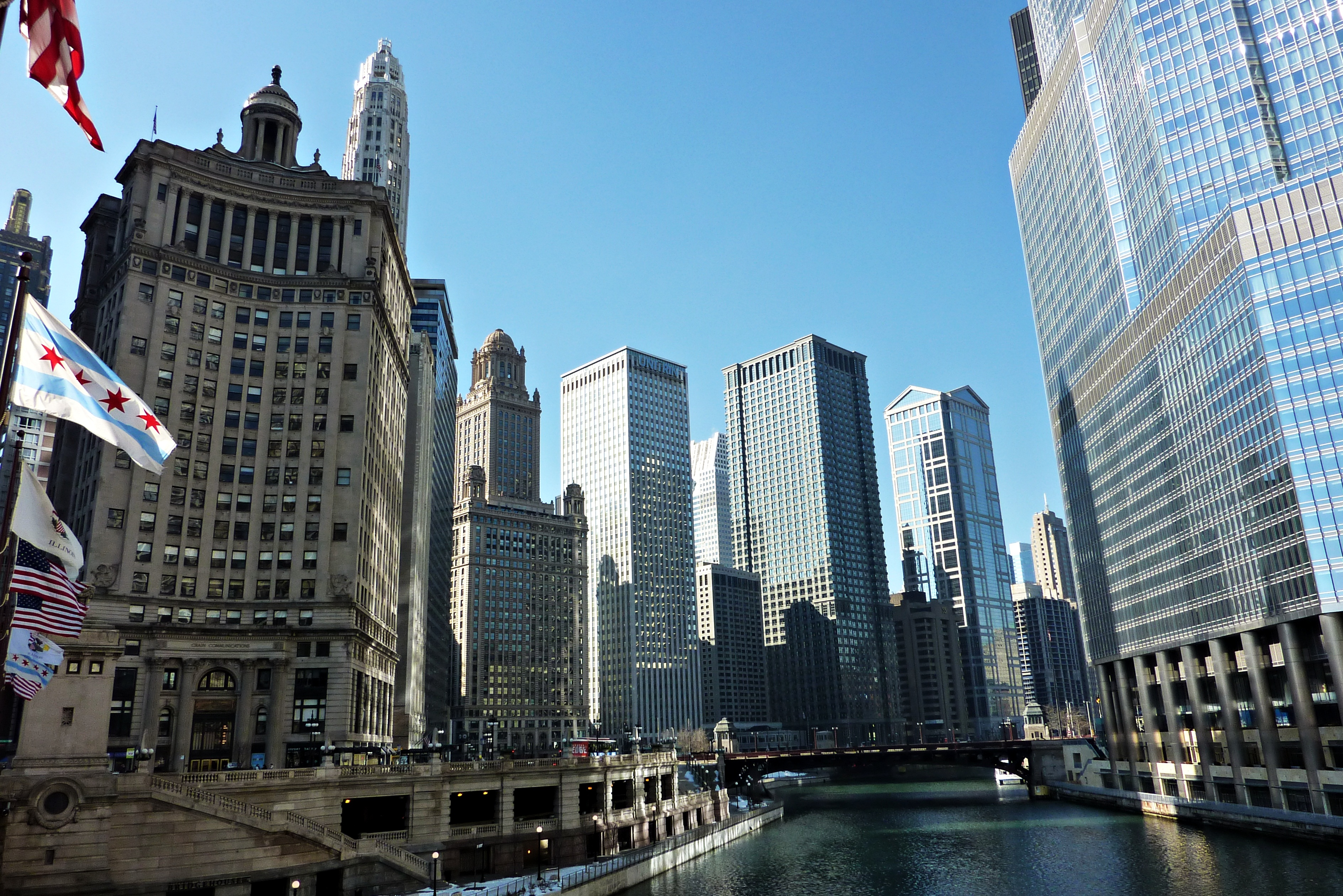
Some of Chicago's landscape provided for the setting of Minneapolis and Atlanta.

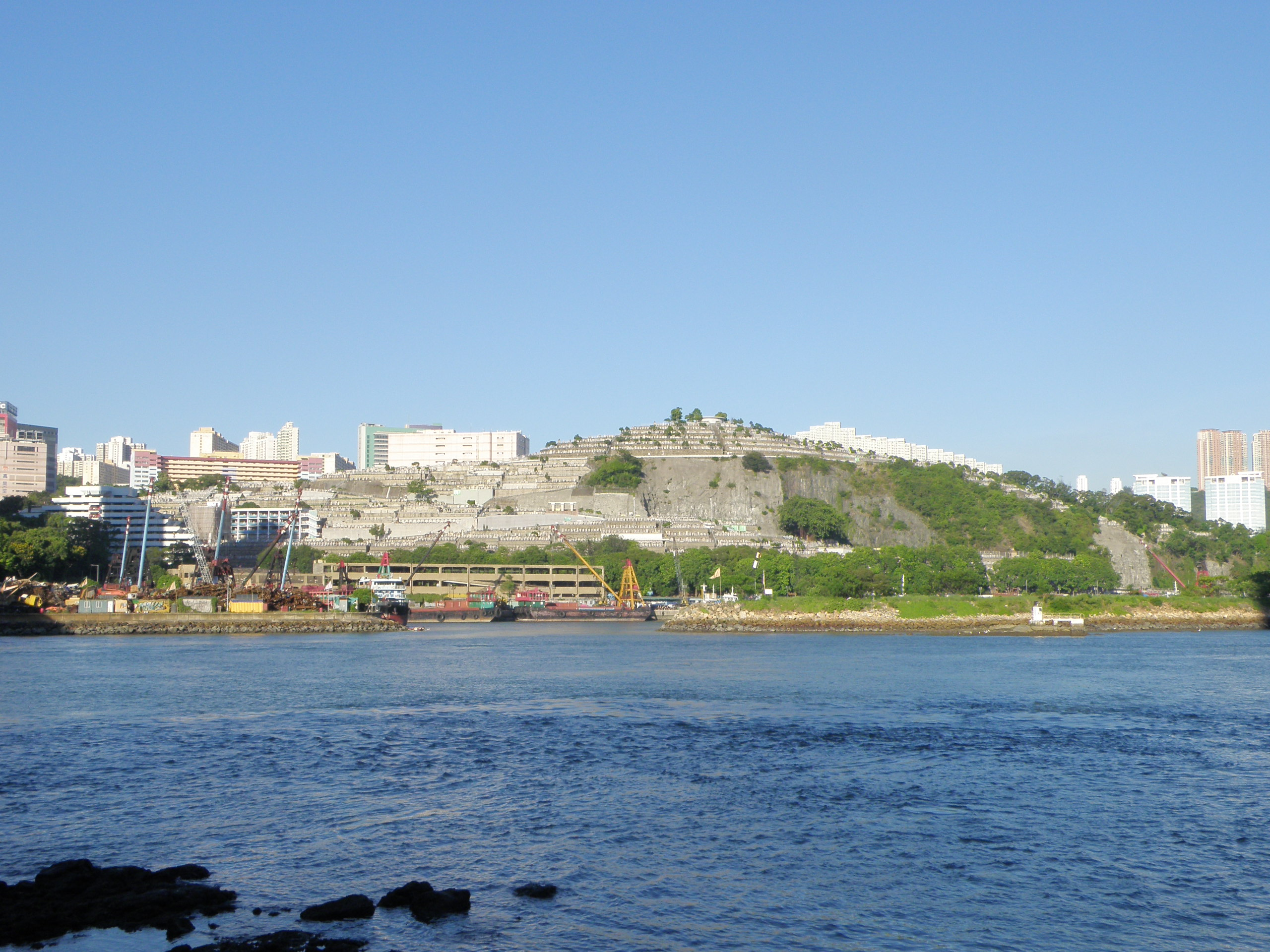
The hostage exchange scene was filmed in Tsuen Wan Chinese Permanent Cemetery, Hong Kong.

In addition to directing, Soderbergh was the cinematographer of Contagion. The film was wholly shot using Red Digital Cinema's RED One MX digital camera, which has a 4.5K image resolution. Since he hoped for the premise to be authentic and "as realistic as possible", Soderbergh opted not to film in the studio. "There's, to me, nothing more satisfying occasionally than making someplace look like someplace else on film and having nobody know the difference." For choosing cities, Soderbergh felt that they couldn't "go anywhere where one of our characters hasn't been", since he wanted to portray an "epic", yet "intimate" scenario. He explained,

We can't cut to a city or a group of extras that we've never been to that we don't know personally. That was our rule. And that's a pretty significant rule to adhere to in a movie in which you're trying to give a sense of something that's happening on a large scale, but we felt that all of the elements that we had issues with prior, when we see any kind of disaster film, we're centered around that idea.

Principal photography started in Hong Kong in September 2010, and continued for approximately two weeks. Soderbergh was originally hoping to also film in mainland China, though Moviefone journalist David Ehrlich believed that permission from the Chinese government was unlikely to be forthcoming. Although producers also intended to establish a filming location in one of the many casinos in Macau, the Jumbo Floating Restaurant in Hong Kong's Aberdeen Harbour was used instead for the casino setting, as filming within the vicinity of a gambling establishment is prohibited by law. To move the equipment for the casino scenes to the on-the-water location, producers hired a number of locals to carry out the task, as they were accustomed to "using sampans like trucks". Additional locations included the Hong Kong International Airport, InterContinental Hong Kong, and the Princess Margaret Hospital.

Principal photography relocated in the following month to Chicago, Illinois, which served as the nexus for production. Much of the cityscape and its surrounding suburbs were used to emulate Minneapolis, Minnesota, and Atlanta, Georgia, in addition to serving as backdrop for Chicago itself. Since principal photography occurred during the winter months, snowfall was a prerequisite in simulating a "persistent coldness" that encompassed "a hypersensitive kind of glare". Within the city limits, filming locations included the Shedd Aquarium, O'Hare International Airport, and Midway Airport. Arguably the largest sets were at the General Jones Armory, which was converted into an infirmary, and a major location shoot occurred in Waukegan, about 40 miles north of Chicago, where a portion of the Amstutz Expressway was used to simulate the Dan Ryan Expressway. Production also took place at Sherman Hospital in Elgin and Central Elementary School in Wilmette, and also in Downtown Western Springs, where the grocery store scene was filmed.

Filming moved once again in January 2011 to the Druid Hills quadrant of Atlanta, which contains the headquarters of the Centers for Disease Control and Prevention. The restricted nature of the CDC campus meant that producers were only allowed to shoot exterior scenes of the area, as well as within the parking garage and reception area for the CDC's museum onsite. Principal photography then proceeded into Atlanta's central business district and Decatur, before advancing to London, Geneva, and lastly San Francisco, California, in the ensuing month. The San Francisco Film Commission charged filmmakers $300 per day for production within the city limits. In the North Beach and Potrero Hill sections of the city, production designer Howard Cummings scattered trash and discarded clothing on the ground to depict the rapid decline of civilization. For the Civic Center set, over 2,000 extras were sought for in background roles; actors who were a part of the Screen Actors Guild were paid $139 per day, while nonunion workers received $64 per day for their work. Other filming locations were established at Golden Gate Park, Chinatown, and Candlestick Park; it cost $60,000 to rent the football stadium for six days. Genentech Hall at the University of California, San Francisco Mission Bay campus was used for filming also, renamed Mendel Hall for the occasion.

=== Music ===
Cliff Martinez composed the film's soundtrack, which was his first big-screen score for Soderbergh since Solaris in 2002. Given that the pacing of the music was one of Soderbergh's biggest concerns, Martinez needed to maintain a brisk pace throughout the soundtrack, while also conveying fear and hope within the music. "I tried to create the sound of anxiety. And at key, strategic moments I tried to use the music to conjure up the sense of tragedy and loss." Martinez incorporated orchestral elements, and fused them with the predominantly electronic sounds of the score. He noted that the "sound palette for Contagion came by way of combining three very different approaches Steven went through as he was cutting the film." Martinez received a rough cut for the film in October 2010, which contained music that was imbued with elements of The French Connection (1971) and Marathon Man (1976). He "loved" those two soundtracks, and composed a few pieces in their style. A few months later, he acquired a new cut, which included music influenced by German electronic group Tangerine Dream. Toward the end, Soderbergh changed again and used contemporary soundtrack music that was "more energetic and more rhythmic". Ultimately, Martinez used aspects of all three approaches: "I reasoned that combining them would not only be effective but would give the score a style all its own." The score was released by WaterTower Music in September 2011.

== Themes and analysis ==
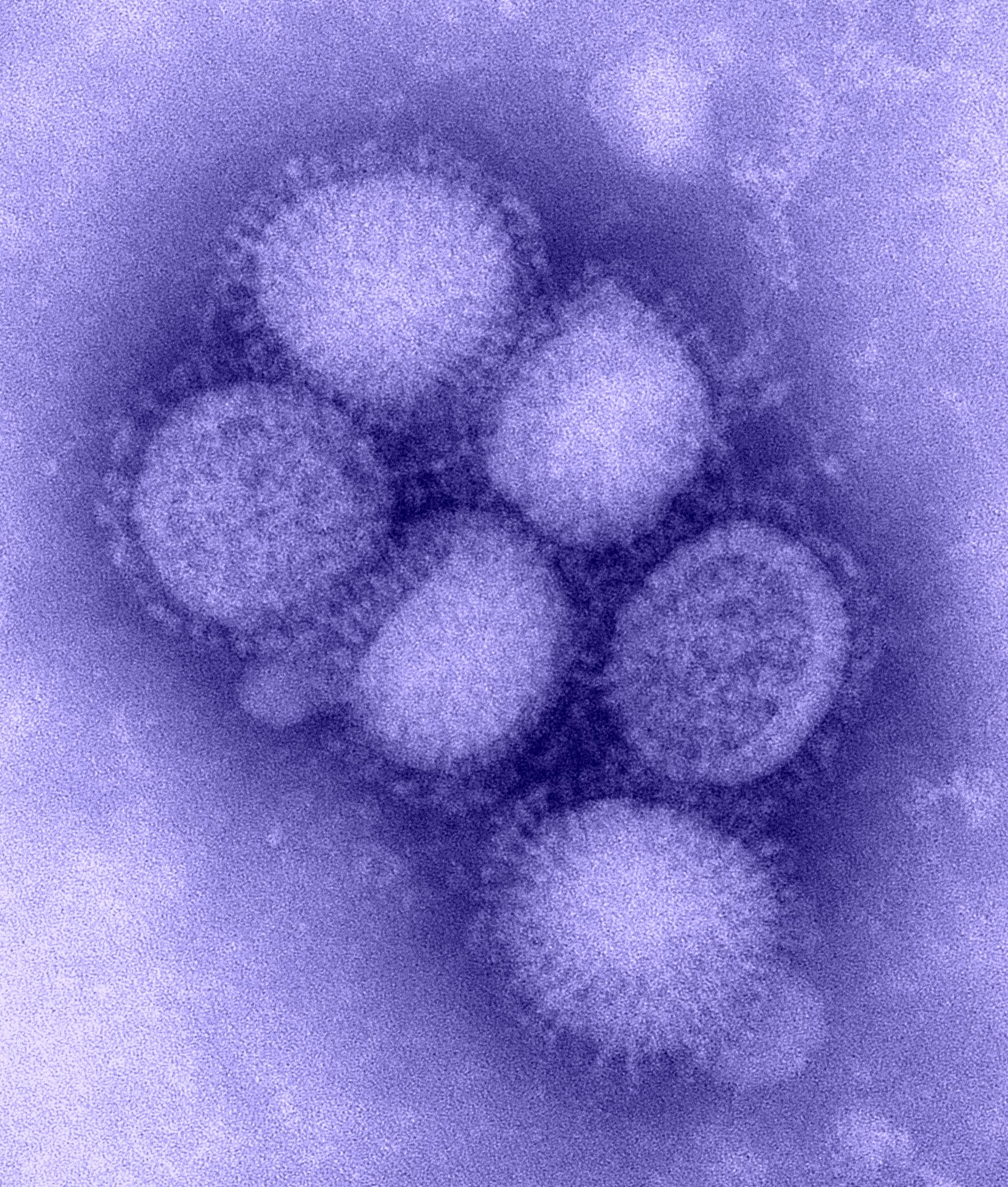
An electron microscope image of the H1N1 influenza virus. The 2009 flu epidemic was a key inspiration and influence on the creation of Contagion.

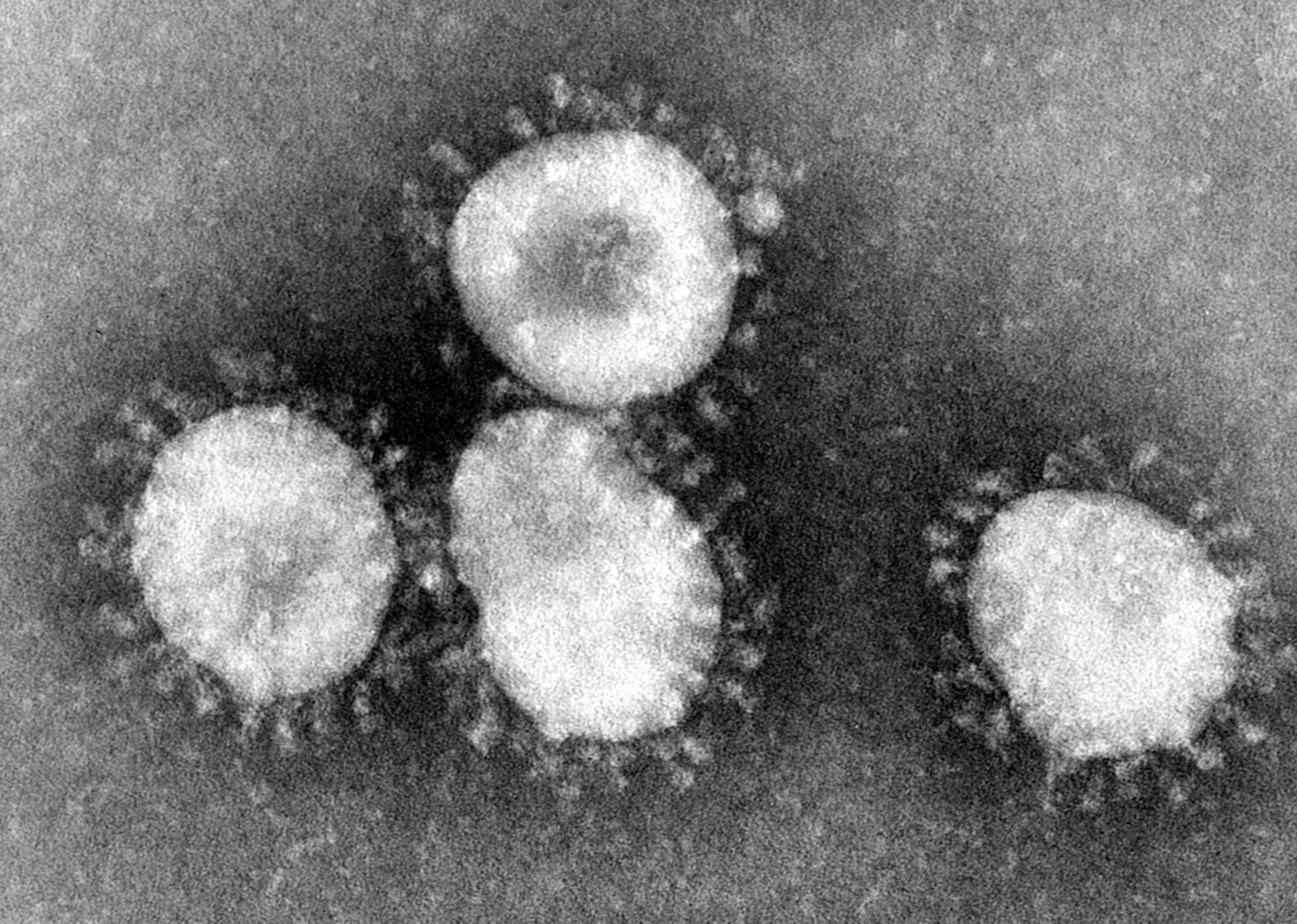
An electron microscope image of the SARS virus. The 2003 SARS outbreak was also an inspiration and influence of Contagion.

Soderbergh was motivated to make an "ultra-realistic" film about public health and scientific response to a pandemic. The film's "hyperlink style" (often quickly moving back and forth from geographically distant places and persons) emphasizes both the historically new perils of contemporary networked globalization and timeless qualities of the human condition (recalling literary treatments of epidemics such as Albert Camus's The Plague). The movie touches on a variety of themes, including the factors which drive mass panic and collapse of social order, the scientific process for characterizing and containing a novel pathogen, balancing personal motives against professional responsibilities and ethics in the face of an existential threat, the limitations and consequences of public health responses, and the pervasiveness of interpersonal connections which can serve as vectors to spread disease. Soderbergh acknowledged the salience of these post-apocalyptic themes is heightened by reactions to the September 11 attacks and Hurricane Katrina. The movie was intended to realistically convey the "intense" and "unnerving" social and scientific reactions to a pandemic. The real-life epidemics such as the 2002–2004 SARS outbreak and the 2009 flu pandemic have been inspirations and influences in the film. The chain of contagion involving bats and pigs is reminiscent of the trail of the Nipah virus (which infects cells in the respiratory and nervous systems, the same cells as the virus in the movie) that originated in Malaysia in 1997, which similarly involved the disturbance of a bat colony by deforestation. In fact, the film uses a Nipah virus protein model in a scene describing the recombination found in the fictional paramyxovirus.

The film presents examples of crowd psychology and collective behavior which can lead to mass hysteria and the loss of social order. The bafflement, outrage, and helplessness associated with the lack of information, combined with new media such as blogs, allow conspiracy theorists like Krumwiede to spread disinformation and fear, which become dangerous contagions themselves. Dr. Cheever must balance the need for full disclosure but avoid a panic and allow the time to characterize and respond to an unknown virus. The movie indirectly critiques the greed, selfishness, and hypocrisy of isolated acts in contemporary culture and the unintended consequences they can have in the context of a pandemic. For example, the Centers for Disease Control and Prevention recommends social distancing by forcibly isolating the healthy to limit the spread of the disease, which stands in stark opposition to contemporary demands for social networking. Responding to the pandemic presents a paradox, as the contagiousness and lethality of the virus instills deep distrust of others but surviving and limiting the spread of the disease also requires individuals to work together.

Against this existential threat and fraying social order, the film also explores how individual characters bend or break existing rules for both selfish and selfless reasons. Dr. Hextall violates protocols by testing a potential vaccine on herself, Dr. Sussman continues experiments on a cell line despite orders to destroy his samples, Dr. Cheever notifies his fiancée to leave the city before a public quarantine is imposed, Sun Feng kidnaps Dr. Orantes to secure vaccine supplies for his village, Dr. Mears continues her containment work despite contracting the virus, and Krumwiede is paid to use his blog to peddle snake oil cures so as to drive demand and profit for investors in alternative medicine. Soderbergh repeatedly uses the cinematographic style of lingering and focusing on the items and objects which are touched by the infected and become vectors (fomites) to infect other people. These objects link characters together and reinforce the multi-narrative hyperlink cinema style which Soderbergh developed in Traffic (2000) and Syriana (2005), which he produced.

The story also highlights examples of political cronyism (a plane potentially available to evacuate Dr. Mears from Minneapolis is instead diverted to evacuate a congressman), platitudes and rigid thinking (public health officials consider postponing the closing of shopping malls until after the Thanksgiving shopping season), federal responders trying to navigate 50 separate state-level public health policies, and the heroism of federal bureaucrats. Soderbergh does not use type-cast pharmaceutical executives or politicians as villains, but instead portrays bloggers such as Krumwiede in a negative light. Social media play a role in Krumwiede's accusations against Dr. Cheever and in Emhoff's daughter's attempts to carry on a relationship with her boyfriend through text messaging. Other responses in the movie, such as Emhoff's appropriating a shotgun from a friend's abandoned house to protect his home from looters, imposition of federal quarantines and curfews, the allocation of vaccines by lottery, inadequate federal preparation and responses, and use of bar-coded wristbands to identify the inoculated highlight the complex tensions between freedom and order in responding to a pandemic. Soderbergh uses Emhoff to illustrate the micro-effects of macro-level decisions.

== Release ==
=== Theatrical ===
Contagion premiered on September 3, 2011, at the 68th Venice International Film Festival in Venice, Italy, and a wider release followed on September 9. In the United States and Canada, Contagion was shown in 3,222 theaters, of which 254 were IMAX venues.

=== Home media ===
Contagion was released on DVD and Blu-ray in North America on January 3, 2012, and in the United Kingdom on March 5, 2012. In its first week of release, the film topped the DVD chart with 411,000 units sold for $6.16 million. That same week it sold 274,000 Blu-ray copies for $4.93 million, topping that chart as well. DVD sales dropped during the second week of release, with 193,000 units sold for $2.89 million. As of early July 2012, Contagion had sold 802,535 copies in DVD, for $12.01 million in revenue.

Additionally, an Ultra HD Blu-ray edition, with HDR remastering overseen by the director, was released on February 27, 2024.

== Reception ==
=== Box office ===
Various American commercial analysts anticipated that the film would have ticket sales of between $20–$25 million during its opening weekend, which it did, grossing $8 million on its first day, and $23.1 million for the entire weekend. Of that total, ten percent ($2.3 million) of the gross came from IMAX screenings. By outgrossing competitor The Help ($8.7M), Contagion became the highest-grossing film of the week. Demographically, the opening audience was evenly divided among gender, according to Warner Bros. Pictures, while eighty percent of spectators were of the age of 25 and over. Contagion did well the following weekend, generating a $14.5 million box office, but came in second to the re-release of The Lion King (1994). The third week saw the box office drop by forty percent, for a total gross of $8.7 million. By the fourth week, Contagion had dropped to ninth place at the box office with $5 million, and the number of theaters narrowed to 2,744. The film completed its theatrical run on December 15, 2011, at which point its total domestic gross was $75.6 million.

Contagion made its international debut in six foreign markets the same weekend as its American release, including Italy, where it achieved $663,000 from 309 theaters. The first week saw Contagion gross $2.1 million from 553 establishments—a per-theater average of $3,797. Foreign grosses for Contagion would remain relatively stagnant up until the weekend of October 14–16, 2011, when the film expanded into several additional European markets. Out of the $3.9 million that was generated from 1,100 venues during that weekend, nearly 40% of the gross originated from Spain, where the film earned $1.5 million from 325 theaters. With the growing expansion of the film in seven additional markets, the weekend of October 21–23, 2011 saw Contagion take in $9.8 million from 2,505 locations, increasing the international gross to $22.9 million. In the United Kingdom, one of the film's significant international releases, Contagion opened in third place at the box office with $2.3 million from 398 theaters; it subsequently garnered the highest debut gross of a Soderbergh film since Ocean's Thirteen (2007). International grosses for Contagion totaled $60.8 million.

=== Critical response ===
Contagion has received positive reviews by film commentators. Review aggregator Rotten Tomatoes reported that 85% of critics have given the film a positive review based on 279 reviews, with an average rating of 7.10/10. The website's critics consensus states, "Tense, tightly plotted, and bolstered by a stellar cast, Contagion is an exceptionally smart – and scary – disaster movie." On Metacritic, which assigns a rating out of 100 based on the critiques from mainstream critics, the film received an average score of 70 based on 38 reviews, indicating "generally favorable" reviews. Audiences polled by CinemaScore gave the film an average grade of "B−" on an A+ to F scale.

The Guardian journalist Peter Bradshaw felt that Contagion blended well together as a film, although opined that Soderbergh was somewhat unsuccessful in channeling the fears, frights, and "the massive sense of loss" of "ordinary people". To David Denby of The New Yorker, the "brilliant" film was "serious, precise, frightening," and "emotionally enveloping". Despite applauding Soderbergh for "hopscotching" tidily "between the intimate and international", The Atlantic's Christopher Orr was disappointed with the film's detached and "clinical" disposition, which led him to conclude that Contagion should have gone with a more inflexible rationale, or a lesson "beyond 'wash your hands often and hope you're lucky'." "For all the craft that went into it, Contagion is ultimately beyond good or bad, beyond criticism. It just is," professed The Atlantic writer. Describing it as a "smart" and "spooky" installment, Manohla Dargis of The New York Times wrote, "Mr. Soderbergh doesn't milk your tears as things fall apart, but a passion that can feel like cold rage is inscribed in his images of men and women isolated in the frame, in the blurred point of view of the dying and in the insistent stillness of a visual style that seems like an exhortation to look." Regarding the story, Salon columnist Andrew O'Hehir avouched that the "crisp" and succinct narrative matched up to the "beautifully composed" visuals of the film. Todd McCarthy of The Hollywood Reporter proclaimed that Soderbergh and Burns effectively created anxiety in the "shrewd" and "unsensationalistic" film without becoming exaggerated, a sentiment echoed by Jeannette Catsoulis of NPR, who insisted that the duo "weave multiple characters into a narrative that's complex without being confusing, and intelligent without being baffling". Writing for The Village Voice, Karina Longworth thought that Contagion reflected the "self-consciousness" and "experimentation" of some of Soderbergh's previous efforts, such as the Ocean's trilogy and The Girlfriend Experience (2009).

The performances of multiple cast members were frequently mentioned in the reviews. The Boston Globe journalist Wesley Morris praised not only Ehle's performance, but the work of the "undercard" such as Cranston, Gould, and Colantoni, among others. Similarly, Peter Travers of Rolling Stone called Ehle the "best in show". As Los Angeles Times' Kenneth Turan summed up, "Two-time Tony-winning actress Jennifer Ehle comes close to stealing the picture with this quietly yet quirkily empathetic performance." With regard to Law, The Philadelphia Inquirer's Steven Rea stated that the actor portrayed the character with a "nutty" confidence; Mick LaSalle from the San Francisco Chronicle agreed with Rea's thoughts. Damon provided the film's "relatable heart", according to Forrest Wickman of Slate, who concluded that even with her controlled performance, Winslet "lives up to her head-of-the-class reputation even in an unusually small role".

The character development of multiple characters produced varying response from critics. Contrary to Mitch's stance as the main protagonist, Michael O'Sullivan of The Washington Post felt that Contagion "treats him with an oddly clinical detachment". In particular Law's character, Alan Krumwiede, attracted commentary from Roger Ebert of the Chicago Sun-Times, who wrote, "The blogger subplot doesn't interact clearly with the main story lines and functions mostly as an alarming but vague distraction."

=== Scientific response ===
Ferris Jabr of New Scientist approved of Contagion for accurately portraying the "successes and frustrations" of science. Jabr cites story elements such as "the fact that before researchers can study a virus, they need to figure out how to grow it in cell cultures in the lab, without the virus destroying all the cells" as examples of accurate depictions of science. Carl Zimmer, a science writer, praised the film, stating, "It shows how reconstructing the course of an outbreak can provide crucial clues, such as how many people an infected person can give a virus to, how many of them get sick, and how many of them die." He also describes a conversation with the film's scientific consultant, W. Ian Lipkin, in which Lipkin defended the rapid generation of a vaccine in the film. Zimmer wrote that "Lipkin and his colleagues are now capable of figuring out how to trigger immune reactions to exotic viruses from animals in a matter of weeks, not months. And once they've created a vaccine, they don't have to use Eisenhower-era technology to manufacture it in bulk." Paul Offit, a pediatrician and vaccination expert, stated that "typically when movies take on science, they tend to sacrifice the science in favor of drama. That wasn't true here." Offit appreciated the film's usage of concepts such as R_{0} and fomites, as well as the fictional strain's origins, which was based on the Nipah virus.

== Legacy ==
The film received renewed popularity in 2020 due to the emergence of the COVID-19 pandemic. By March 2020, Contagion was the seventh-most-popular film on iTunes, listed as the number two catalog title on Warner Bros. compared to its number 270 rank the past December 2019, and had average daily visits on piracy websites increase by 5,609 percent in January 2020 compared to the previous month. HBO Now also reported that Contagion had been the most viewed film for two weeks straight.

As the film continued to regain popularity, the cast reunited through an infomercial type public service announcement in partnership with the Columbia University Mailman School of Public Health in March 2020. Regarding its resurgence in 2020, screenwriter Scott Z. Burns responded in an interview with The Washington Post saying, "It is sad, and it is frustrating. Sad because so many people are dying and getting sick. Frustrating because people still don't seem to grasp the situation we are now in and how it could have been avoided by properly funding the science around all of this. It is also surreal to me that people from all over the world write to me asking how I knew it would involve a bat or how I knew the term 'social distancing'. I didn't have a crystal ball — I had access to great expertise. So, if people find the movie to be accurate, it should give them confidence in the public health experts who are out there right now trying to guide us."

In February 2021, British Health Secretary Matt Hancock revealed that watching the scramble for vaccines in Contagion inspired him to order a much larger quantity of COVID-19 vaccines for the United Kingdom than his advisers recommended, accelerating the UK's eventual rollout of its vaccination programme ahead of other European countries.

In December 2020, Soderbergh announced that a "philosophical sequel" for the film was in the works. In April 2026, Soderbergh later confirmed the sequel to the film has been cancelled.
