= Dłusko Leśne =

- Hamlet
- Location within Poland
- Coordinates: 53°01′04″N 14°41′37″E
- Country: Poland
- Voivodeship: West Pomeranian
- County: Gryfino
- Municipality: Banie
- Time zone: UTC+1 (CET)
  - Summer (DST): UTC+2 (CEST)
- Area code: +48 91
- Car plates: ZGR

Dłusko Leśne (Polish: [ˈdwus.kɔ ˈlɛɕ.nɛ]), also known as Lipka (Polish: [ˈlip.ka]), is a hamlet in the West Pomeranian Voivodeship, Poland, located within the municipality of Banie in Gryfino County.
