= MassTag-PCR =

MassTag PCR is a modification of PCR based on mass-spectrometric detection of an end product. This technology was developed by researchers from the Mailman School of Public Health at Columbia University and the Columbia Genome Center.

== Principles ==
Like conventional PCR, MassTag-PCR uses primer pairs. The difference is primers used for MassTag PCR are tagged with molecules of known masses or MassCodes. Instead of single pair of primers this technology uses a number of primers, making it a multiplex system. Unlike, conventional Multiplex PCR system, in MassTag PCR more than 15 primer pairs could be used. If DNA from any of the agent of primer panel is present, it will be amplified. Each amplified product will carry its specific Masscodes. The PCR product is then purified to remove unbound primers, dNTPs, enzyme and other impurities. Finally, the purified PCR products are subjected to UV light as the chemical bond between the nucleic acids and primers is photolabile. As the Masscodes are liberated from PCR products they are detected with a Mass Spectrometer. Presence of specific MassCode indicates the presence of specific pathogen.

== Applications ==
This technique has been found to detect a previously uncharacterized clade of rhinovirus. MassTag PCR is a more comprehensive and sensitive diagnostic technique, CII was able to determine the cause of this illness for 26 out of 79 previously unknown cases. MassTag PCR demonstrated its tripartite value as a tool for surveillance, outbreak detection, and epidemiology.
