= Lipka (surname) =

Lipka (Czech/Slovak feminine: Lipková) is a surname. Notable people with this surname include:

- Alfred Lipka (1931–2010), Czech-born German violist
- František Lipka (born 1946), Slovak diplomat and poet
- Frédéric Lipka (born 1968), French figure skater
- Kasia Lipka (born 1993), English footballer
- Leszek Lipka (born 1958), Polish footballer
- Mark Lipka, comic book artist
- Matt Lipka (born 1992), American baseball player
- Robert Lipka (1945–2013), American spy
- Warren Lipka, American footballer
