= Emmanuil Lipkind =

Russian-Israeli painter

Emmanuil Lipkind Эммануил Липкинд
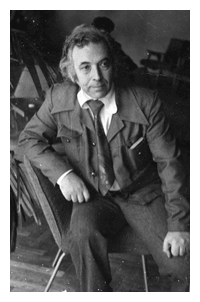
- Emmanuil Lipkind, 1974
- Born: Emmanuil Lipkind; 17 October 1928; Kazan, Russia
- Died: 4 February 2007 (aged 78); Jerusalem, Israel
- Known for: Painting, Art
- Movement: Realism, Russian artists

Emmanuil Lipkind (Russian: Эммануил Липкинд, Hebrew: אמנויל ליפקינד; 1928–2007) was a Russian-Israeli painter. He was born in Kazan, Russia and lived in Moscow beginning in 1964. In 1994, he moved with his wife to Israel. He was a member of the International Association of Art (UNESCO) and of the Russian Artist Union. Many of his works are kept in Russian museums, in the Yad va Shem Memorial in Israel as well as in private collections. Lipkind worked in Latvia, former Yugoslavia, Middle Asian Countries and Israel.

He died in 2007 in Jerusalem.

== Education ==
- 1948–1954 Master of Arts degree at the Latvian Academy of Art, Riga, Latvia
- 1947–1948 Spent a year at the Leningrad Art College
- 1942–1947 Graduated with distinction from Kazan Art College

== Teaching ==
- 1966–1994 Moscow Art College, Russia, Senior Teacher
- 1954–1961 Kazan Art College, Russia, teacher of painting, drawing and composition

== Awards and prizes ==
- 1999–2000 Keren Hayyesod Project for Calendar for the year 5760 (1999–2000)
- 1997 Shoshana and Mordechay Ish-Shalom Prize for Painting
- 1966–1987 Moscow Art College named after the 1905th Year, senior Teacher
- 1957 Prize of the 6th International Youth Festival in Moscow
- 1954–1961 Kazan Art College, teacher of painting, drawing and composition

=== Selected solo exhibitions ===
- 2012 Beit Shmuel Art Gallery the "Dialogue and Landscape", Jerusalem, with Anna Khodorkovski
- 2010 The Jerusalem House of Quality presents "Light and Color"
- 2003 Theatron Yerushalaim, Jerusalem
- 1999 Godovich's private gallery, Jerusalem
- 1997 Exhibition on the occasion of the International Christian Conference, Palace of the Nathion, Jerusalem
- 1995 “Landscape and Memory”, Art Village, Jerusalem
- 1975 “Limbaji Landscapes”, Limbaji, Latvia
- 1969 “State Ice Ballet Dancers”, Crystal Hall, Moscow

=== Selected group exhibitions ===
- 2014 "Crazy Colors – Spring", the General Exhibition Gallery Kiryat HaAmanim, Safed, the Exhibition at Migdalei Neeman, Tel Aviv
- 2014 Two exhibitions "City in Motion", Cinema Hotel Tel Aviv
- 2014 Art Festival in Eilat, "Eilat Presents Talents" Exhibitions* Hotel Dan Eilat, Eilat Conservatory, Eilat University
- 2014 "Israeli Artists Come to Ariel", Ariel Geihal a Tarbut
- 2014 The Art-Festival in Lighthouse Gallery (Old Jaffa Reveals its Secrets) Exhibitions* "Path", "Ripple"
- 1999–2006 Safrai Gallery, Jerusalem
- 1996–2007 Artist's House Gallery, Jerusalem
- 1999 Autumn Exhibition of the Jerusalem Artists, Institute for Israel Studies, Jerusalem
- 1998 “Desert Mirrors”, Tova Osman's, Efrat and Baprozdor Galleries, Tel-Aviv
- 1997 David Gallery, Jerusalem
- 1996 Exhibition of New Members of the International Association of Art, Artist's House, Jerusalem
- 1991 Exhibition of Moscow Artists, the Central Exhibition Hall Manezh, Moscow
- 1985, 1981, 1975 “Moscow Artists Celebrate a Great Victory”, Kuznetsky most Exhibition Hall, Moscow
- 1979, 1961 the All-Union Exhibition dedicated to the 50th Anniversary of the Soviet Circus, the Central Exhibition Hall Manezh, Moscow
- 1957 the Jubilee Exhibition in the academy of Art, Moscow

== Personal life ==
Lipkind was married and had a daughter, Anna Khodorovsky Lipkind, also an artist.
