= Lipki, Kireyevsky District, Tula Oblast =

Town in Tula Oblast, Russia

Lipki Липки
- Town
- Interactive map of Lipki
- Location of Lipki Lipki (Tula Oblast)
- Coordinates: 53°56′N 37°42′E
- Country: Russia
- Federal subject: Tula Oblast
- Administrative district: Kireyevsky District
- Town under district jurisdictionSelsoviet: Lipki
- Known since: 17th century
- Town status since: 1955
- Elevation: 240 m (790 ft)

Population (2010 Census)
  - Total: 8,719
  - Estimate (2021): 8,325 (−4.5%)

Administrative status
  - Capital of: Lipki Town Under District Jurisdiction

Municipal status
  - Municipal district: Kireyevsky Municipal District
  - Urban settlement: Lipki Urban Settlement
  - Capital of: Lipki Urban Settlement
- Time zone: UTC+3 (MSK)
- Postal codes: 301264, 301265
- OKTMO ID: 70628113001

Lipki (Russian: Ли́пки) is a town in Kireyevsky District of Tula Oblast, Russia, located 38 kilometers (24 mi) south of Tula, the administrative center of the oblast. Population: 8,719 (2010 census); 9,843 (2002 census); 10,355 (1989 Soviet census).

== History ==
The village of Lipki has been known since at least the 17th century. In 1949, it was granted urban-type settlement status due to the development of coal deposits. It was granted town status in 1955.

== Administrative and municipal status ==
Within the framework of administrative divisions, it is, together with one rural locality (the settlement of Komsomolsky), incorporated within Kireyevsky District as Lipki Town Under District Jurisdiction. As a municipal division, Lipki Town Under District Jurisdiction is incorporated within Kireyevsky Municipal District as Lipki Urban Settlement.
