= Chagas =

Chagas (Portuguese: ['ʃagɐʃ] or ['ʃagɐs]) may refer to:

- Chagas disease
- 9483 Chagas, a main-belt asteroid
- a Portuguese-language family name, translating to wounds

== People ==
- Carlos Chagas (1879–1934), a Brazilian sanitary physician, scientist and bacteriologist
- Carlos Chagas Filho (1910–2000), a Brazilian physician, biologist and scientist
- Evandro Chagas (1905–1940), a Brazilian physician and biomedical scientist
- Francisco das Chagas Rodrigues de Brito (born 1965), Brazilian serial killer
- Gabriel Chagas (born 1944), a Brazilian bridge player
- Manuel Chagas (possibly living), a Portuguese Olympic fencer
- Marco Chagas (born 1956), a Portuguese former professional racing cyclist
- Marinho Chagas (born 1952), a Brazilian former football player
- Walmor Chagas (born 1931), a Brazilian actor

with compound surnames

- Fernando Chagas Carvalho Neto (born 1952), the Brazilian current Vice-President of Sport Club Internacional
- Francisco Clodoaldo Chagas Ferreira (born 1978), a Brazilian football player
- Pedro Chagas Freitas (living), a Portuguese writer, journalist, writing teacher and public speaker
- Dyanfres Douglas Chagas Matos (born 1987), a Brazilian football player
- António Chagas Rosa (born 1960), a Portuguese composer of contemporary classical music
- Cristian Chagas Tarouco (born 1988), a Brazilian football player
- João Pinheiro Chagas (1863–1925), a Portuguese journalist and politician
- Rodrigo José Queiroz Chagas (born 1973), a Brazilian retired football player
- Martin Andrade Weber Chagas Carvalho (born 1985), a Brazilian retired football player

with surname Das Chagas

- António das Chagas (1631–1682), a Portuguese Franciscan and ascetical writer
- Diogo das Chagas (c. 1584–c. 1661), a Franciscan friar and Azorean historian
- Luís Gonçalves das Chagas, Baron of Candiota (c. 1815–1894), a Brazilian landowner, military leader and noble
- Ouraci Francisco das Chagas (born 1941), a Brazilian retired football player
- Ana Beatriz Francisco das Chagas (born 1971), a Brazilian volleyball player

== Places ==
- Carlos Chagas, Minas Gerais, a Brazilian municipality located in the northeast of the state of Minas Gerais

== See also ==
- Chaga
