= Bacteriophage experimental evolution =

Experimental evolution studies are a means of testing evolutionary theory under carefully designed, reproducible experiments. Given enough time, space, and money, any organism could be used for experimental evolution studies. However, those with rapid generation times, high mutation rates, large population sizes, and small sizes increase the feasibility of experimental studies in a laboratory context. For these reasons, bacteriophages (i.e. viruses that infect bacteria) are especially favored by experimental evolutionary biologists. Bacteriophages, and microbial organisms, can be frozen in stasis, facilitating comparison of evolved strains to ancestors. Additionally, microbes are especially labile from a molecular biologic perspective. Many molecular tools have been developed to manipulate the genetic material of microbial organisms, and because of their small genome sizes, sequencing the full genomes of evolved strains is trivial. Therefore, comparisons can be made for the exact molecular changes in evolved strains during adaptation to novel conditions.

== Experimental studies, by category ==
=== Laboratory phylogenetics ===
Phylogenetics is the study of the evolutionary relatedness of organisms. Laboratory phylogenetics is the study of the evolutionary relatedness of laboratory-evolved organisms. An advantage of laboratory phylogenetics is the exact evolutionary history of an organism is known, rather than estimated as is the case for most organisms.

=== Epistasis ===
Epistasis is the dependence of the effect of one gene or mutation on the presence of another gene or mutation. Theoretically epistasis can be of three forms: no epistasis (additive inheritance), synergistic (or positive) epistasis and antagonistic (or negative) epistasis. In synergistic epistasis, each additional mutation has increasing negative impact on fitness. In antagonistic epistasis, the effect of each mutation declines with increasing numbers of mutation. Understanding whether the majority of genetic interactions are synergistic or antagonistic will help solve such problems as the evolution of sex.

The phage literature provides many examples of epistasis which are not studied under the context of experimental evolution nor necessarily described as examples of epistasis.

=== Experimental adaptation ===
Experimental adaptation involves selection of organisms either for specific traits or under specific conditions. For example, strains could be evolved under conditions of high temperatures to observe the molecular changes that facilitate survival and reproduction under those conditions.

The reader should be aware that numerous phage experimental adaptations were performed in the early decades of phage study.

==== Adaptation to new or modified hosts. ====
The older phage literature, e.g., pre-1950s, contains numerous examples of phage adaptations to different hosts.

==== Adaptation to modified conditions ====
The older phage literature, e.g., pre-1950s, also contains examples of phage adaptations to different culture conditions, such as phage T2 adaptation to low salt conditions.

==== Adaptation as compensation for deleterious mutations. ====
There are many examples in early phage literature of bacteriophages adapting and compensating for deleterious mutations.

==== Adaptation as toward change in phage virulence ====
Virulence is the negative impact that a pathogen (or parasite) has on the Darwinian fitness of a harboring organism (host). For phage, virulence results either in reduction of bacterial division rates or, more typically, in the death (via lysis) of individual bacteria. A number of theory papers exist on this subject, especially as it applies to the evolution of phage latent period.

The older phage literature contains numerous references to phage virulence, and phage virulence evolution. However, the reader should be warned that virulence is often used as a synonym for "not temperature", a usage which is neither employed here nor to be encouraged generally.

=== Impact of sex/coinfection ===
More than one phage can coinfect the same bacterial cell. When this happens, the phage can exchange genes, which is equivalent to "sex." Note that a number of the immediately following studies employ sex to overcome Muller's ratchet while papers that demonstrate Muller's ratchet (i.e., without employing sex to overcome the result) are instead presented under that heading.

=== Muller’s ratchet ===
Muller’s ratchet is the gradual, but irreversible accumulation of deleterious mutations in asexual organisms. Asexual organisms do not undergo gene exchange and therefore cannot recreate mutation-free genomes. Chao, 1997, provides a phage-emphasizing review of the subject.

=== Prisoner’s dilemma ===
Prisoner's dilemma is a part of game theory which involves two individuals choosing to cooperate or defect, reaping differential rewards. During phage coinfection, it pertains to viruses which produce more protein products than they use (cooperators) and viruses which use more protein products than they produce (defectors).

=== Coevolution ===
Coevolution is the study of the evolutionary influence that two species have upon each other. Phage-bacterial coevolution is typically studied within the context of phage community ecology.

== Bibliography ==
http://en.citizendium.org/wiki/Bacteriophage_experimental_evolution/Bibliography -

=== Laboratory phylogenetics ===
- Hahn, M. W., M. D. Rausher, and C. W. Cunningham, 2002. Distinguishing between selection and population expansion in an experimental lineage of bacteriophage T7. Genetics 161:11-20.
- Oakley, T. H., and C. W. Cunningham, 2000. Independent contrasts succeed where ancestor reconstruction fails in a known bacteriophage phylogeny. Evolution 54:397-405.
- Cunningham, C.W., K. Jeng, J. Husti, M. Badgett, I.J. Molineux, D.M. Hillis and J.J. Bull, 1997. Parallel molecular evolution of deletions and nonsense mutations in bacteriophage T7. Mol. Biol. Evol. 14:113-116.
- Bull, J. J., C. W. Cunningham, I. J. Molineux, M. R. Badgett, and D. M. Hills, 1993. Experimental molecular evolution of bacteriophage T7. Evolution 47:993-1007.
- Hillis, D.M., J.J. Bull, M.E. White, M.R. Badgett and I.J. Molineux, 1992. Experimental phylogenetics: generation of a known phylogeny. Science. 255:589-592.
- Studier, F. W., 1980. The last of the T phages, p. 72-78. In N. H. Horowitz and E. Hutchings Jr. (eds.), Genes, Cells, and Behavior: A View of Biology Fifty Years Later.
- Studier, F. W., 1979. Relationships among different strains of T7 and among T7-related bacteriophages. Virology 95:70-84.

=== Epistasis ===
- Burch, C.L., and L. Chao. 2004. Epistasis and its relationships to canalization in the RNA virus _6. Genetics. 167:559-567.
- You, L., and J. Yin. 2002. Dependence of epistasis on environment and mutation severity as revealed by in silico mutagenesis of phage T7. Genetics. 160:1273-1281.
- Schuppli, D., J. Georgijevic, and H. Weber. 2000. Synergism of mutations in bacteriophage Q_ RNA affecting host factor dependence of Q_ replicase. J. Mol. Biol. 295:149-154.

The phage literature provides many examples of epistasis which are not studied under the context of experimental evolution nor necessarily described as examples of epistasis.

=== Experimental adaptation ===
- Bull, J. J., J. Millstein, J. Orcutt and H.A. Wichman. 2006. Evolutionary feedback mediated through population density, illustrated with viruses in chemostats. Am. Nat. 167:E39-E51.
- Bull, J. J., M. R. Badgett, R. Springman, and I. J. Molineux. 2004. Genome properties
- Bull, J. J., M. R. Badgett, D. Rokyta, and I. J. Molineux. 2003. Experimental evolution yields hundreds of mutations in a functional viral genome. J. Mol. Evol. 57:241-248.
- Bull, J. J., M.R. Badgett, H.A. Wichman, J.P. Hulsenbeck, D.M. Hillis, A. Gulati, C. Ho and I.J. Molineux. 1997. Exceptional convergent evolution in a virus. Genetics. 147:1497-1507.

The reader should be aware that numerous phage experimental adaptations were performed in the early decades of phage study.

==== Adaptation to usual hosts. ====
- Wichman, H. A., J. Wichman, and J. J. Bull. 2005. Adaptive molecular evolution for 13,000 phage generations: A possible arms race. Genetics 170:19-31.
- Rokyta, D., M. R. Badgett, I. J. Molineux, and J. J. Bull. 2002. Experimental genomic evolution: extensive compensation for loss of DNA ligase activity in a virus. Mol. Biol. Evol. 19:230-238.
- Burch, C. L., and L. Chao. 2000. Evolvability of an RNA virus is determined by its mutational neighbourhood. Nature 406:625-628.
- Wichman, H. A., L. A. Scott, C. D. Yarber, and J. J. Bull. 2000. Experimental evolution
- Wichman, H. A., M. R. Badgett, L. A. Scott, C. M. Boulianne, and J. J. Bull. 1999. Different trajectories of parallel evolution during viral adaptation. Science 285:422-424.

==== Adaptation to new or modified hosts. ====
- Duffy, S., P. E. Turner, and C. L. Burch. 2006. Pleiotropic Costs of Niche Expansion in the RNA Bacteriophage _6. Genetics 172:751-757.
- Pepin, K. M., M. A. Samuel, and H. A. Wichman. 2006. Variable Pleiotropic Effects From Mutations at the Same Locus Hamper Prediction of Fitness From a Fitness Component. Genetics 172:2047-2056.
- Crill, W. D., H. A. Wichman, and J. J. Bull. 2000. Evolutionary reversals during viral adaptation to alternating hosts. Genetics 154:27-37.
- Bull, J. J., A. Jacoboson, M. R. Badgett, and I. J. Molineux. 1998. Viral escape from antisense RNA. Mol. Microbiol. 28:835-846.
- Hibma, A. M., S. A. Jassim, and M. W. Griffiths. 1997. Infection and removal of L-forms of Listeria monocytogenes with bred bacteriophage. Int. J. Food Microbiol. 34:197-207.
- Jassim, S. A. A., S. P. Denyer, and G. S. A. B. Stewart. 1995. Virus breeding. International Patent Application. WO 9523848. (under tab labeled "documents")
- Schuppli, D., G. Miranda, H. C. T. Tsui, M. E. Winkler, J. M. Sogo, and H. Weber. 1997. Altered 3'-terminal RNA structure in phage Q_ adapted to host factor-less Escherichia coli. Proc. Natl. Acad. Sci. USA 94:10239-10242.
- Hashemolhosseini, S., Z. Holmes, B. Mutschler, and U. Henning. 1994. Alterations of receptor specificities of coliphages of the T2 family. J. Mol. Biol. 240:105-110.

The older phage literature, e.g., pre-1950s, contains numerous examples of phage adaptations to different hosts.

==== Adaptation to modified conditions ====
- Bacher, J. M., J. J. Bull, and A. D. Ellington. 2003. Evolution of phage with chemically ambiguous proteomes. BMC Evol. Biol. 3:24
- Bull, J. J., A. Jacoboson, M. R. Badgett, and I. J. Molineux. 1998. Viral escape from
- Merril, C. R., B. Biswas, R. Carlton, N. C. Jensen, G. J. Creed, S. Zullo, and S. Adhya. 1996. Long-circulating bacteriophage as antibacterial agents. Proc. Natl. Acad. Sci. USA 93:3188-3192.
- Gupta, K., Y. Lee and J. Yin. 1995. Extremo-phage: in vitro selection of tolerance to a hostile environment. J. Mol. Evol. 41:113-114.

The older phage literature, e.g., pre-1950s, also contains examples of phage adaptations to different culture conditions, such as phage T2 adaptation to low salt conditions.

==== Adaptation to high temperatures. ====
- Knies, J.L., R. Izem, K.L. Supler. J.G. Kingsolver, and C.L. Burch. 2006. The genetic basis of thermal reaction norm evolution in lab and natural phage population. PLoS Biology. 4:e201.
- Poon, A., and L. Chao. 2005. The rate of compensatory mutation in the DNA bacteriophage _X174. Genetics. 170:989-999.
- Poon, A., and L. Chao. 2004. Drift increases the advantage of sex in RNA bacteriophage _6. Genetics 166:19-24.
- Holder, K. K., and J. J. Bull. 2001. Profiles of adaptation in two similar viruses. Genetics 159:1393-1404.
- Bull, J. J., M. R. Badgett, and H. A. Wichman. 2000. Big-benefit mutations in a bacteriophage inhibited with heat. Mol. Biol. Evol. 17:942-950.

==== Adaptation as compensation for deleterious mutations. ====
- Poon, A., and L. Chao. 2005. The rate of compensatory mutation in the DNA bacteriophage _X174. Genetics. 170:989-999.
- Heineman, R. H., I. J. Molineux, and J. J. Bull. 2005. Evolutionary robustness of an optimal phenotype: re-evolution of lysis in a bacteriophage deleted for its lysin gene. J. Mol. Evol. 61:181-191.
- Hayashi, Y., H. Sakata, Y. Makino, I. Urabe, and T. Yomo. 2003. Can an arbitrary sequence evolve towards acquiring a biological function? J. Mol. Evol. 56:162-168.
- Rokyta, D., M. R. Badgett, I. J. Molineux, and J. J. Bull. 2002. Experimental genomic evolution: extensive compensation for loss of DNA ligase activity in a virus. Mol. Biol. Evol. 19:230-238.
- Burch, C. L., and L. Chao. 1999. Evolution by small steps and rugged landscapes in the RNA virus _6. Genetics 151:921-927.
- Klovins, J., N. A. Tsareva, M. H. de Smit, V. Berzins, and D. Van. 1997. Rapid evolution of translational control mechanisms in RNA genomes. J. Mol. Biol. 265:372-384. &
- Olsthoorn, R. C., and J. van Duin. 1996. Evolutionary reconstruction of a hairpin deleted from the genome of an RNA virus. Proc. Natl. Acad. Sci. USA 93:12256-12261.
- Nelson, M. A., M. Ericson, L. Gold, and J. F. Pulitzer. 1982. The isolation and characterization of TabR bacteria: Hosts that restrict bacteriophage T4 rII mutants Mol. Gen. Genet. 188:60-68.
- Nelson, M.A. and L. Gold. 1982. The isolation and characterization of bacterial strains (Tab32) that restrict bacteriophage T4 gene 32 mutants Mol. Gen. Genet. 188:69-76.

There are many examples in the early phage literature of phage adapting and compensating for deleterious mutations.

==== Adaptation as toward change in phage virulence ====
- Betts A., Vasse M., Kaltz O. & Hochberg M.E. (2013). Back to the future: evolving bacteriophages to increase their effectiveness against the pathogen Pseudomonas aeruginosa PAO1. Evol Appl PDF
- Kerr, B., C. Neuhauser, B. J. M. Bohannan, and A. M. Dean. 2006. Local migration promotes competitive restraint in a host–pathogen 'tragedy of the commons'. Nature 442:75-78.
- Wang, I.-N. 2006. Lysis timing and bacteriophage fitness. Genetics 172:17-26.
- Abedon, S. T., P. Hyman, and C. Thomas. 2003. Experimental examination of bacteriophage latent-period evolution as a response to bacterial availability. Appl. Environ. Microbiol. 69:7499-7506.
- Messenger, S. L., I. J. Molineux, and J. J. Bull. 1999. Virulence evolution in a virus obeys a trade-off. Proc. R. Soc. Lond. B Biol. Sci. 266:397-404.
- Bull, J. J., and I. J. Molineux. 1992. Molecular genetics of adaptation in an experimental model of cooperation. Evolution 46:882-895.
- Bull, J. J., I. J. Molineux, and W. R. Rice. 1991. Selection for benevolence in a host-parasite system. Evolution 45:875-882.

The older phage literature contains numerous references to phage virulence, and phage virulence evolution. However, the reader should be warned that virulence is often used as a synonym for "not temperate", a usage which is neither employed here nor to be encouraged generally.

=== Impact of sex/coinfection ===
- Froissart, R., C. O. Wilke, R. Montville, S. K. Remold, L. Chao, and P. E. Turner. 2004. Co-infection weakens selection against epistatic mutations in RNA viruses. Genetics
- Montville, R., R. Froissart, S. K. Remold, O. Tenaillon, and P. E. Turner. 2005. Evolution of mutational robustness in an RNA virus. PLoS Biology 3:e381
- Sachs, J.L. and J. J. Bull. 2005. Experimental evolution of conflict mediation between genomes. Proc. Natl. Acad. Sci. 102:390-395.
- Poon, A., and L. Chao. 2004. Drift increases the advantage of sex in RNA bacteriophage
- Turner, P. E., and L. Chao. 1998. Sex and the evolution of intrahost competition in RNA virus _6. Genetics 150:523-532.
- L. Chao, T. T. Tran, and T. T. Tran. 1997. The advantage of sex in the RNA virus _6. Genetics 147:953-959.
- Malmberg, R. L. 1977. The evolution of epistasis and the advantage of recombination in populations of bacteriophage T4. Genetics 86:607-621.

=== Muller’s ratchet ===
- de la Peña, M., S. F. Elena, and A. Moya. 2000. Effect of deleterious mutation-accumulation on the fitness of RNA bacteriophage MS2. Evolution 54:686-691.
- L. Chao. 1990. Fitness of RNA virus decreased by Muller's ratchet. Nature 348:454-455.

=== Prisoner’s dilemma ===
- Turner, P. E., and L. Chao. 2003. Escape from Prisoner's Dilemma in RNA phage _phi6. Am. Nat. 161:497-505.
- Turner, P. E., and L. Chao. 1999. Prisoner's dilemma in an RNA virus. Nature 398:441-443.

=== Coevolution ===
- Buckling, A., Y. Wei, R. C. Massey, M. A. Brockhurst, and M. E. Hochberg. 2006. Antagonistic coevolution with parasites increases the cost of host deleterious mutations. Proc. R. Soc. Lond. B Biol. Sci. 273:45-49.
- Morgan, A. D., S. Gandon, and A. Buckling. 2005. The effect of migration on local adaptation in a coevolving host-parasite system. Nature 437:253-256.
- Forde, S. E., J. N. Thompson, and B. J. M. Bohannan. 2004. Adaptation varies through space and time in a coevolving host–parasitoid interaction. Nature 431:841-844.
- Mizoguchi, K., M. Morita, C. R. Fischer, M. Yoichi, Y. Tanji, and H. Unno. 2003. Coevolution of bacteriophage PP01 and Escherichia coli O157:H7 in continuous culture. Appl. Environ. Microbiol. 69:170-176.
- Buckling, A., and P. B. Rainey. 2002. Antagonistic coevolution between a bacterium and a bacteriophage. Proc. R. Soc. Lond. B Biol. Sci. 269:931-936.
- Buckling, A., and P. B. Rainey. 2002. The role of parasites in sympatric and allopatric host diversification. Nature 420:496-499.
- Lenski, R.E. and B.R. Levin. 1985. Constraints on the coevolution of bacteria and virulent phage – a model, some experiments and predictions for natural communities. Am. Nat. 125:585-602.
- Chao, L., B.R. Levin, and F.M. Stewart. 1977. A complex community in a simple habitat: an experimental study with bacteria and phage. Ecology. 58:369-378.
