= Experimental evolution =

Use of laboratory and field experiments to explore evolutionary dynamics

Experimental evolution is the use of laboratory experiments or controlled field manipulations to explore evolutionary dynamics. Evolution may be observed in the laboratory as populations adapt to new environmental conditions by natural selection.

Adaptation can arise in experimental evolution in two different ways. One is via an individual organism gaining a novel beneficial mutation. The other is from allele frequency change in standing genetic variation already present in a population of organisms. Other evolutionary forces outside of mutation and natural selection can also play a role or be incorporated into experimental evolution studies, such as genetic drift and gene flow.

The organism used is decided by the experimenter, based on the hypothesis to be tested. Many generations are required for adaptive mutation to occur, and experimental evolution via mutation is carried out in viruses or unicellular organisms with rapid generation times, such as bacteria and asexual clonal yeast. Polymorphic populations of asexual or sexual yeast, and multicellular eukaryotes like Drosophila, can adapt to new environments through allele frequency change in standing genetic variation. Organisms with longer generations times, although costly, can be used in experimental evolution. Laboratory studies with foxes and with rodents (see below) have shown that notable adaptations can occur within as few as 10–20 generations and experiments with wild guppies have observed adaptations within comparable numbers of generations.

More recently, experimentally evolved individuals or populations are often analyzed using whole genome sequencing, an approach known as Evolve and Resequence (E&R). E&R can identify mutations that lead to adaptation in clonal individuals or identify alleles that changed in frequency in polymorphic populations, by comparing the sequences of individuals/populations before and after adaptation. The sequence data makes it possible to pinpoint the site in a DNA sequence that a mutation/allele frequency change occurred to bring about adaptation. The nature of the adaptation and functional follow up studies can shed insight into what effect the mutation/allele has on phenotype.

== History ==
=== Domestication and breeding ===
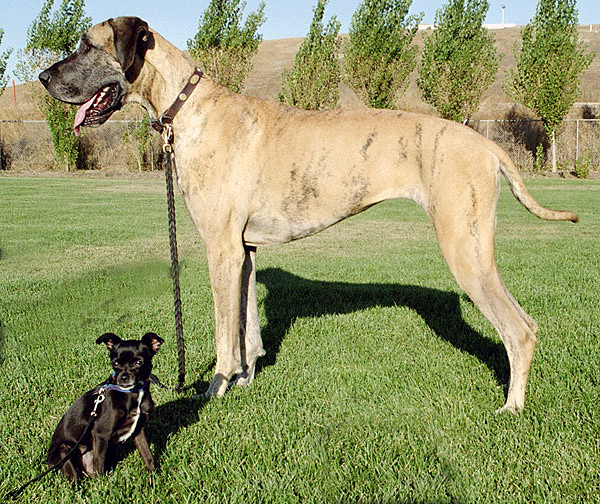
This Chihuahua mix and Great Dane show the wide range of dog breed sizes created using artificial selection.

Unwittingly, humans have carried out evolution experiments for as long as they have been domesticating plants and animals. Selective breeding of plants and animals has led to varieties that differ dramatically from their original wild-type ancestors. Examples are the cabbage varieties, maize, or the large number of different dog breeds. The power of human breeding to create varieties with extreme differences from a single species was already recognized by Charles Darwin. In fact, he started out his book The Origin of Species with a chapter on variation in domestic animals. In this chapter, Darwin discussed in particular the pigeon.

Altogether at least a score of pigeons might be chosen, which if shown to an ornithologist, and he were told that they were wild birds, would certainly, I think, be ranked by him as well-defined species. Moreover, I do not believe that any ornithologist would place the English carrier, the short-faced tumbler, the runt, the barb, pouter, and fantail in the same genus; more especially as in each of these breeds several truly-inherited sub-breeds, or species as he might have called them, could be shown him. (...) I am fully convinced that the common opinion of naturalists is correct, namely, that all have descended from the rock-pigeon (Columba livia), including under this term several geographical races or sub-species, which differ from each other in the most trifling respects.

— Charles Darwin, The Origin of Species

=== Early ===
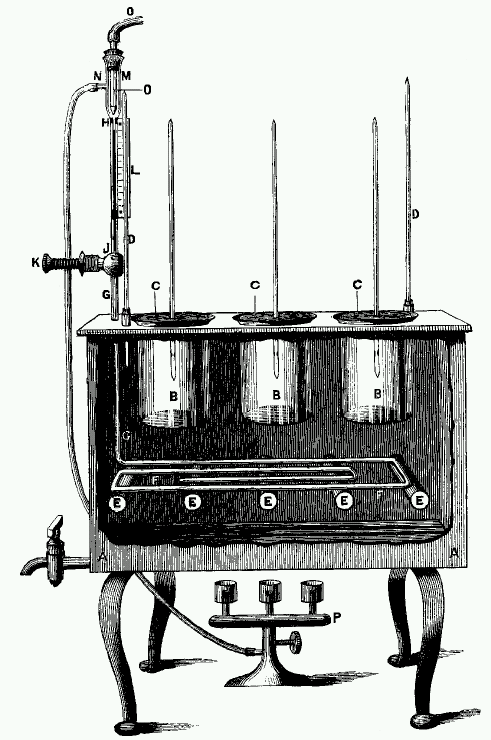
Drawing of the incubator used by Dallinger in his evolution experiments

One of the first to carry out a controlled evolution experiment was William Dallinger. In the late 19th century, he cultivated small unicellular organisms in a custom-built incubator over a time period of seven years (1880–1886). Dallinger slowly increased the temperature of the incubator from an initial 60 °F up to 158 °F. The early cultures had shown clear signs of distress at a temperature of 73 °F, and were certainly not capable of surviving at 158 °F. The organisms Dallinger had in his incubator at the end of the experiment, on the other hand, were perfectly fine at 158 °F. However, these organisms would no longer grow at the initial 60 °F. Dallinger concluded that he had found evidence for Darwinian adaptation in his incubator, and that the organisms had adapted to live in a high-temperature environment. Dallinger's incubator was accidentally destroyed in 1886, and Dallinger could not continue this line of research.

From the 1880s to 1980, experimental evolution was intermittently practiced by a variety of evolutionary biologists, including the highly influential Theodosius Dobzhansky. Like other experimental research in evolutionary biology during this period, much of this work lacked extensive replication and was carried out only for relatively short periods of evolutionary time.

== Modern ==
Experimental evolution has been used in various formats to understand underlying evolutionary processes in a controlled system. Experimental evolution has been performed on multicellular and unicellular eukaryotes, prokaryotes, and viruses. Similar works have also been performed by directed evolution of individual enzyme, ribozyme and replicator genes.

=== Aphids ===
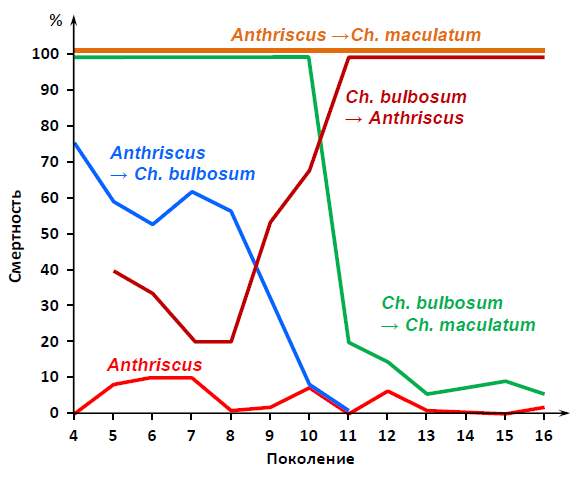
поколения=generations, Смертность=mortality

In the 1950s, the Soviet biologist Georgy Shaposhnikov conducted experiments on aphids of the Dysaphis genus. By transferring them to plants normally nearly or completely unsuitable for them, he had forced populations of parthenogenetic descendants to adapt to the new food source to the point of reproductive isolation from the regular populations of the same species.

=== Fruit flies ===
One of the first of a new wave of experiments using this strategy was the laboratory "evolutionary radiation" of Drosophila melanogaster populations that Michael R. Rose started in February, 1980. This system started with ten populations, five cultured at later ages, and five cultured at early ages. Since then more than 200 different populations have been created in this laboratory radiation, with selection targeting multiple characters. Some of these highly differentiated populations have also been selected "backward" or "in reverse," by returning experimental populations to their ancestral culture regime. Hundreds of people have worked with these populations over the better part of three decades. Much of this work is summarized in the papers collected in the book Methuselah Flies.

The early experiments in flies were limited to studying phenotypes but the molecular mechanisms, i.e., changes in DNA that facilitated such changes, could not be identified. This changed with genomics technology. Subsequently, Thomas Turner coined the term Evolve and Resequence (E&R) and several studies used E&R approach with mixed success. One of the more interesting experimental evolution studies was conducted by Gabriel Haddad's group at UC San Diego, where Haddad and colleagues evolved flies to adapt to low oxygen environments, also known as hypoxia. After 200 generations, they used E&R approach to identify genomic regions that were selected by natural selection in the hypoxia adapted flies. More recent experiments are following up E&R predictions with RNAseq and genetic crosses. Such efforts in combining E&R with experimental validations should be powerful in identifying genes that regulate adaptation in flies.

Much recently the experimental evolution in flies have taken the course to address the molecular mechanisms and in doing so it might pave way to understand physiology of an organism better and thus redefine disease therapeutics.

=== Microbes ===
Many microbial species have short generation times, easily sequenced genomes, and well-understood biology. They are therefore commonly used for experimental evolution studies. The bacterial species most commonly used for experimental evolution include P. fluorescens, Pseudomonas aeruginosa, Enterococcus faecalis and E. coli (see below), while the Yeast S. cerevisiae has been used as a model for the study of eukaryotic evolution.

==== Lenski's E. coli experiment ====
One of the most widely known examples of laboratory bacterial evolution is the long-term E.coli experiment of Richard Lenski. On February 24, 1988, Lenski started growing twelve lineages of E. coli under identical growth conditions. When one of the populations evolved the ability to aerobically metabolize citrate from the growth medium and showed greatly increased growth, this provided a dramatic observation of evolution in action. The experiment continues to this day, and is now the longest-running (in terms of generations) controlled evolution experiment ever undertaken. Since the inception of the experiment, the bacteria have grown for more than 60,000 generations. Lenski and colleagues regularly publish updates on the status of the experiments.

=== Leishmania donovani ===
Bussotti and collaborators isolated amastigotes from Leishmania donovani and cultured them in vitro for 3800 generations (36 weeks). The culture of these parasites showed how they adapted to in vitro conditions by compensating for the loss of a NIMA-related kinase, important for the correct progression of mitosis, by increasing the expression of another orthologous kinase as the culture generations progressed. Furthermore, it was observed how L. donovani has been adapted to in vitro culture by reducing the expression of 23 transcripts related to flagellar biogenesis and increasing the expression of ribosomal protein clusters and non-coding RNAs such as nucleolar small RNAs. Flagella are considered less necessary by the parasite in in-vitro culture and therefore the progression of generations leads to their elimination, causing an energy saving due to lower motility so that proliferation and growth rate in culture is higher. The amplified snoRNAs also lead to increased ribosomal biosynthesis, increased protein biosynthesis and thus increased growth rate of the culture. These adaptations observed over generations of parasites are governed by copy number variations (CNV) and epistatic interactions between affected genes, and allow us to justify Leishmania genomic instability through its post-transcriptional regulation of gene expression.

=== High Runner laboratory house mice ===
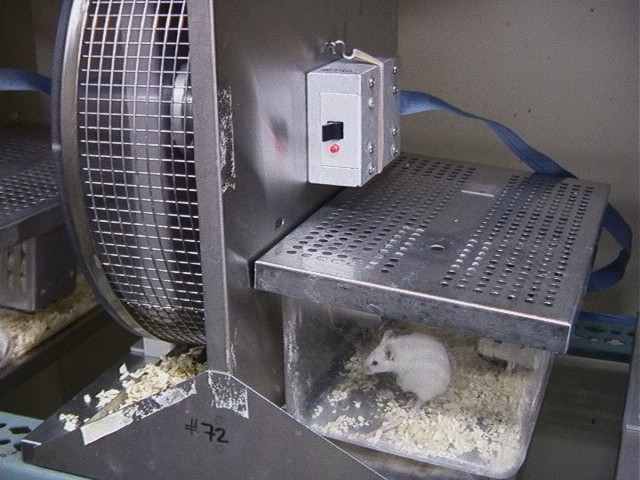
Mouse from the Garland selection experiment with attached running wheel and its rotation counter

In 1993, Theodore Garland, Jr. and colleagues started a long-term experiment that involves selective breeding of mice for high voluntary activity levels on running wheels. This experiment also continues to this day (> 105 generations). Mice from the four replicate "High Runner" lines evolved to run almost three times as many running-wheel revolutions per day compared with the four unselected control lines of mice, mainly by running faster than the control mice rather than running for more minutes/day. However, the High Runner lines have evolved in somewhat different ways, with some emphasizing running speed versus duration or vice versa, thus demonstrating "multiple solutions" that seem to be based partly in evolved muscle characteristics.

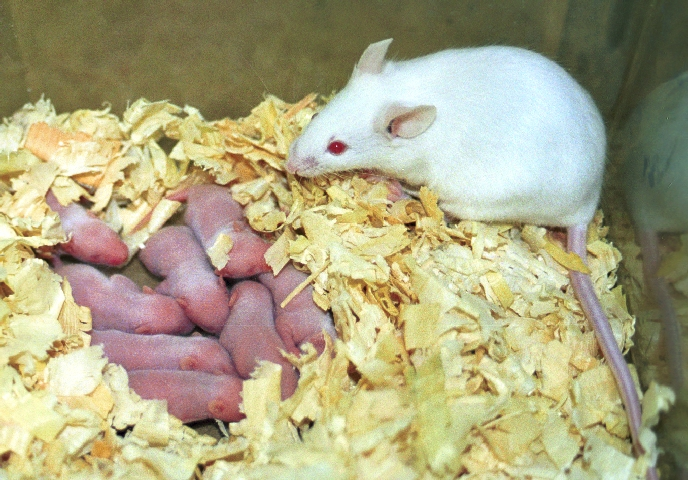
Female mouse with her litter, from the Garland selection experiment

The HR mice have an elevated endurance running ability and maximal aerobic capacity when tested on a motorized treadmill. They also exhibit alterations in motivation and the reward system of the brain. Pharmacological studies point to alterations in dopamine function and the endocannabinoid system. The High Runner lines have been proposed as a model to study human attention-deficit hyperactivity disorder (ADHD), and administration of Ritalin reduces their wheel running approximately to the levels of control mice.

=== Multidirectional selection on bank voles ===
In 2005 Paweł Koteja with Edyta Sadowska and colleagues from the Jagiellonian University (Poland) started a multidirectional selection on a non-laboratory rodent, the bank vole Myodes (= Clethrionomys) glareolus. The voles are selected for three distinct traits, which played important roles in the adaptive radiation of terrestrial vertebrates: high maximum rate of aerobic metabolism, predatory propensity, and herbivorous capability. Aerobic lines are selected for the maximum rate of oxygen consumption achieved during swimming at 38°C; Predatory lines – for a short time to catch live crickets; Herbivorous lines – for capability to maintain body mass when fed a low-quality diet "diluted" with dried, powdered grass. Four replicate lines are maintained for each of the three selection directions and another four as unselected Controls.

After approximately 20 generations of selective breeding, voles from the Aerobic lines evolved a 60% higher swim-induced metabolic rate than voles from the unselected Control lines. Although the selection protocol does not impose a thermoregulatory burden, both the basal metabolic rate and thermogenic capacity increased in the Aerobic lines. Thus, the results have provided some support for the "aerobic capacity model" for the evolution of endothermy in mammals.

More than 85% of the Predatory voles capture the crickets, compared to only about 15% of unselected Control voles, and they catch the crickets faster. The increased predatory behavior is associated with a more proactive coping style ("personality").

During the test with low-quality diet, the Herbivorous voles lose approximately 2 grams less mass (approximately 10% of the original body mass) than the Control ones. The Herbivorous voles have an altered composition of the bacterial microbiome in their caecum. Thus, the selection has resulted in evolution of the entire holobiome, and the experiment may offer a laboratory model of hologenome evolution.

=== Synthetic biology ===
Synthetic biology offers unique opportunities for experimental evolution, facilitating the interpretation of evolutionary changes by inserting genetic modules into host genomes and applying selection specifically targeting such modules. Synthetic biological circuits inserted into the genome of Escherichia coli or the budding yeast Saccharomyces cerevisiae degrade (lose function) during laboratory evolution. With appropriate selection, mechanisms underlying the evolutionary regain of lost biological function can be studied. Experimental evolution of mammalian cells harboring synthetic gene circuits reveals the role of cellular heterogeneity in the evolution of drug resistance, with implications for chemotherapy resistance of cancer cells.

=== Controls in experimental evolution ===
In experimental evolution, control populations are essential for distinguishing treatment-specific evolutionary responses from the background distribution of possible outcomes. Unlike traditional biological experiments—where a single untreated control is often used to test a specific null hypothesis—evolutionary trajectories are inherently stochastic, and replicate control lines commonly diverge from one another. As a result, multiple independent control populations are typically required to characterize the ensemble of outcomes expected in the absence of a particular selective pressure. This distinction is especially important in areas such as the evolution of antimicrobial and cancer drug resistance, where comparing treated populations to a broad distribution of untreated evolutionary outcomes is essential for interpreting adaptive responses (see also Drug resistance).

Large-scale studies have demonstrated substantial variation among replicate populations even under identical conditions. For example, yeast evolution experiments have shown that while populations may share broad patterns of adaptation, the specific mutations and pathways involved often vary idiosyncratically among replicates, often with differing secondary evolutionary consequences. Similarly, long-term microbial evolution experiments have revealed that replicate lines often follow parallel phenotypic trajectories while differing in the underlying mutations that enable those changes.

Because replicate control populations can diverge substantially, their role is not to provide a single expected baseline outcome but rather to define the distribution of evolutionary trajectories possible under neutral or background conditions. This allows researchers to determine whether the mutational, phenotypic, or fitness outcomes observed in treatment groups are statistically distinguishable from the natural variability of evolutionary processes.

=== Other examples ===
Stickleback fish have both marine and freshwater species, the freshwater species evolving since the last ice age. Freshwater species can survive colder temperatures. Scientists tested to see if they could reproduce this evolution of cold-tolerance by keeping marine sticklebacks in cold freshwater. It took the marine sticklebacks only three generations to evolve to match the 2.5 degree Celsius improvement in cold-tolerance found in wild freshwater sticklebacks.

Microbial cells and recently mammalian cells are evolved under nutrient limiting conditions to study their metabolic response and engineer cells for useful characteristics.

== For teaching ==
Because of their rapid generation times microbes offer an opportunity to study microevolution in the classroom. A number of exercises involving bacteria and yeast teach concepts ranging from the evolution of resistance to the evolution of multicellularity. With the advent of next-generation sequencing technology it has become possible for students to conduct an evolutionary experiment, sequence the evolved genomes, and to analyze and interpret the results.

== For industrial use ==
Laboratory synthetic evolution, not necessarily directed, is also used to develop new phenotypes in organisms used for biomanufacturing. Natural mutations can be complemented with methods that directly generate phenotypic diversity. With yeast, the generation of new phenotypes can be accelerated by manipulation at the transcription level: by stochastically introducing artificial transcription factors, globally altering the transcription machinery, CRISPR interference and activation. Also with yeast, transposons, loxP sequences, and highly error-prone orthogonal DNAP-DNA plasmid pairs can be used to accelerate the generation of mutations.

== See also ==
- Artificial selection
- Bacteriophage experimental evolution
- Directed evolution
- Domestication
- Evolutionary biology
- Evolutionary physiology
- Genetics
- Genomics of domestication
- Laboratory experiments of speciation
- Quantitative genetics
- Selection limits
- Selective breeding
- Tame Silver Fox
- Drug resistance
