= Fernando Chagas Carvalho Neto =

Vice-president of Football of Sport Club Internacional

Fernando Carvalho
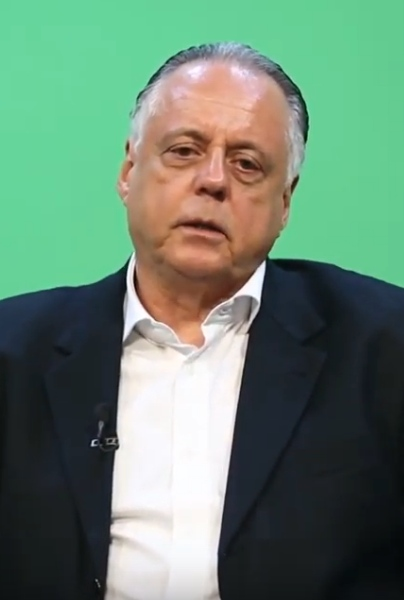
- Born: Fernando Chagas Carvalho Neto; November 1, 1952 (age 73); Porto Alegre, Rio Grande do Sul, Brazil
- Education: UNISINOS
- Occupation: Lawyer
- Known for: President of Sport Club Internacional
- Term: 2002-2006
- Predecessor: Fernando Miranda
- Successor: Vitório Piffero
- Spouse: Flavia Andrade Weber Chagas Carvalho (partner)
- Children: Samantha Andrade Weber Chagas Carvalho e Martin Andrade Weber Chagas Carvalho

Fernando Chagas Carvalho Neto (born November 1, 1952, in Porto Alegre, Rio Grande do Sul, Brazil) is the current vice-president of Football of Sport Club Internacional. He was president of this club between 2002 and 2006.

Carvalho is a lawyer (he graduated from the UNISINOS) with his own firm, Chagas Carvalho Advocacia. Carvalho is married to Flávia Andrade Weber Chagas Carvalho and has two sons, Samantha and Martin, a former Internacional player.

== Career at Internacional ==
He started his involvement with Sport Club Internacional directing the youth teams of club. After many years of contributions with Inter, He won the 2002 elections and assumed the Presidency. Under his command, Internacional won his first Copa Libertadores and the FIFA Club World Cup in 2006. After 2006, Carvalho had a hiatus of administrative roles in Internacional, returning in 2009 as vice-president of Football, role similar as Director of Football.

== Trophies won by club during presidency ==
- Campeonato Gaúcho (4):
  - 2002, 2003, 2004 and 2005.
- Copa Libertadores (1):
  - 2006
- FIFA Club World Cup (3):
  - 2006
