= Martin Carvalho =

Brazilian footballer

Personal information
- Full name: Martin Andrade Weber Chagas Carvalho
- Date of birth: March 11, 1985 (age 41)
- Place of birth: Porto Alegre, Brazil
- Height: 1.79 m (5 ft 10 in)
- Position: Forward

Youth career
- 2001–2005: Internacional

Senior career*
Years	Team	Apps	(Gls)
2006–2008	Internacional	2	(1)
2006	→ 15 de Novembro (loan)	0	(0)
2007	→ Vasco (loan)	0	(0)
2008	Palmeiras B	0	(0)
2009	Martítimo	0	(0)
- * Club domestic league appearances and goals

Martin Andrade Weber Chagas Carvalho or simply Martin Carvalho (born March 11, 1985), is a Brazilian former professional footballer who played as a forward.

== Career ==
Martin Carvalho is son of Fernando Carvalho, former president of the Internacional. After two seasons in Portugal, Martin decided ended his career and become a Football agent. He current plays in amateur leagues in Porto Alegre.
