= Pedro Chagas Freitas =

Portuguese writer

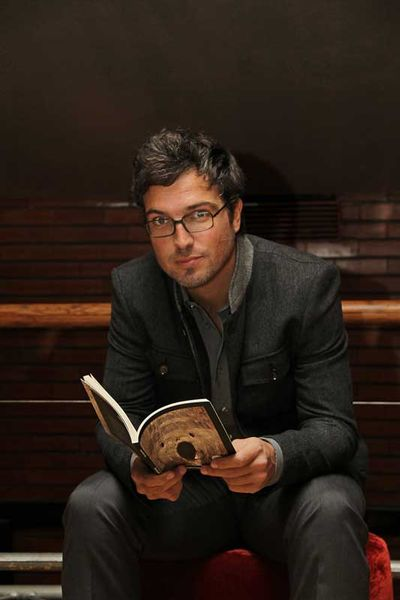
Pedro Chagas Freitas

Pedro Chagas Freitas (born 25 September 1979 in Azurém, Guimarães) is a writer, journalist, writing teacher and public speaker from Portugal. He has more than 15 books published, received a "Young Creators" award from the National Cultural Centre in Portugal and is the creator of a National Championship of Creative Writing. He began as editor-in-chief of the magazine Estádio D. Afonso Henriques (named after Estádio D. Afonso Henriques). He wrote for several newspapers, including A Bola and Desportivo de Guimarães. Chagas Freitas developed the first book written in Facebook and wrote live a romance for 24 consecutive hours in a shopping center. He also works as professional public speaker in the fields of leadership, self-confidence, peak performance and life management. In June 2011 he led a writing seminar at the Escola Profissional de Braga (Braga Professional Training Center).

== Personal life ==
Throughout the years, before he has achieved notability as a writer, he was a lifeguard, bartender, footballer, nightclub doorman and factory worker in the footwear industry. He has a son with his partner Bárbara Teixeira. Pedro Chagas Freitas has a degree in linguistics awarded by the New University of Lisbon.
