= EnteroMix =

Russian therapeutic cancer treatment

EnteroMix (Russian: ЭнтероМикс) is an experimental cancer immunotherapy under development in Russia. According to its developers, EnteroMix is a mixture of four oncolytic viruses—replication-competent human enteroviruses including Coxsackievirus A21, Echovirus 7, Enterovirus B75, and a modified derivative of a Sabin poliovirus vaccine strain—and is administered intravenously.

As of late 2025, it is in Phase I clinical trials, which primarily assess safety, dosage, and preliminary tolerability, rather than effectiveness. In May 2026, the trial was formally registered on ClinicalTrials.gov (identifier NCT07584668) under the investigational code EM-I-2024, providing the first internationally verifiable record of the ongoing Phase I study. EnteroMix gained widespread international media attention in late 2025, despite lack of publications in peer-reviewed journals internationally. Social media claims of high efficacy, imminent availability, and even ‘cure’ status have been shown to be exaggerated and misleading by independent fact-checking organizations.

== Composition ==
According to descriptions provided by the developers, the components of EnteroMix belong to the genus Enterovirus within the family Picornaviridae, which comprises small, non-enveloped, positive-sense single-stranded RNA viruses that infect humans and other mammals. The formulation is described as including four enteroviruses that differ in species classification, receptor usage, and cellular tropism.

The viral components reported to be included in EnteroMix are:

- Coxsackievirus A21 (CVA21), which belongs to the species Coxsackievirus A and utilizes intercellular adhesion molecule 1 (ICAM-1) and decay-accelerating factor (DAF/CD55) as cellular receptors. These molecules are known to be upregulated on the surface of several types of solid tumors.
- Echovirus 7 (ECHO-7), which belongs to the species Enterovirus B and has been reported to attach to DAF/CD55 receptor; as with other picornaviruses, additional host factors may contribute to internalization; integrins have been identified as entry receptors for some enteroviruses.
- Enterovirus B75 (EV-B75), which belongs to the same phylogenetic cluster as echoviruses.
- PV-Russo, which belongs to the species Enterovirus C, the same species as poliovirus. It is a genetically modified poliovirus that is based on the Sabin vaccine strain, and reported to contain elements of a rhinovirus internal ribosome entry site (IRES), a modification intended to alter viral translation and attenuate neurovirulence. Poliovirus enters host cells via CD155 (also known as the poliovirus receptor, or PVR).

According to the developers, the inclusion of multiple enteroviruses with differing receptor specificities is intended to enable infection of heterogeneous tumor cell populations. As of late 2025, full genomic sequences of the viral strains used in EnteroMix and experimental data directly comparing their individual or combined biological properties were not identified in major public sequence repositories or peer-reviewed international literature.

== Classification and description ==
EnteroMix has sometimes been described in media reports as a "cancer vaccine" or as an "mRNA vaccine." According to publicly available statements by the developers, EnteroMix does not fall within conventional vaccine categories and does not employ mRNA-based technology. Instead, it is described as an experimental immunotherapeutic approach based on the systemic administration of live, replication-competent human enteroviruses belonging to the genus Enterovirus (family Picornaviridae), including coxsackievirus, echovirus, and poliovirus-derived components.

By its proposed mode of action, EnteroMix is generally classified as an oncolytic virotherapy, a class of experimental cancer treatments that use viruses capable of selectively infecting and replicating within malignant cells. In this framework, therapeutic activity is expected to arise from direct virus-mediated lysis of tumor cells combined with stimulation of antitumor immune responses following viral replication and tumor cell destruction. The viruses included in EnteroMix are described as replication-competent and as differing in receptor usage and tissue tropism.

Unlike most oncolytic virus platforms currently under clinical development, which typically rely on a single viral agent, EnteroMix has been presented as a multivirus formulation. According to the developers, the rationale for this approach is to combine viruses with differing receptor specificities in order to target heterogeneous tumor cell populations within the same patient. Detailed experimental validation of this multivirus strategy, including published data on interactions between the viral components, has not been reported in peer-reviewed international scientific literature.

== Proposed mechanism of action ==
According to descriptions provided by the developers, the proposed mechanism of action of EnteroMix involves several complementary processes typical of oncolytic virotherapy. These include direct virus-mediated oncolysis resulting from viral replication within susceptible tumor cells, as well as immunostimulatory effects associated with activation of innate immune responses and the release of tumor-associated antigens following virus-induced cell lysis. In addition, the multivirus composition of EnteroMix is described as incorporating enteroviruses with differing receptor specificities and cellular tropisms. According to the developers, this diversity is intended to enable infection of heterogeneous tumor cell populations within the same tumor, potentially expanding the range of cells susceptible to oncolytic effects. As of November 2025, no detailed preclinical data evaluating the combined biological activity of all four viral components, their interactions when administered together, or dose-dependent effects in combination have appeared in peer-reviewed international scientific literature.

== Development and public disclosures ==
EnteroMix is being developed by the National Medical Research Radiological Center of the Ministry of Health of the Russian Federation in collaboration with the Engelhardt Institute of Molecular Biology of the Russian Academy of Sciences. Representatives of both institutions have described the project as a research initiative conducted within the Russian healthcare system. Information about the project's rationale, composition, and progress has appeared primarily in Russian-language media, official institutional announcements, and presentations by the developers. As of November 2025, no detailed peer-reviewed publications describing the development history, preclinical studies, manufacturing processes, or clinical results of EnteroMix have appeared in international scientific journals. An independent analytical review also concluded that there were no publicly accessible registrations in major international clinical trial databases, or full genomic sequence disclosures associated with EnteroMix in any peer-reviewed international scientific literature or major public repositories as of 2024-2025.

== Regulatory status ==
According to announcements from the Ministry of Health of the Russian Federation and developer institutions, authorization was granted to conduct a Phase I clinical trial of EnteroMix within the Russian Federation. The study was reported to have been initiated following regulatory approval and is being conducted under a national clinical trial protocol. As of late 2025, EnteroMix remains in early-stage clinical development. Phase I clinical trials are primarily intended to assess safety and tolerability in humans. National regulatory authorization within the Russian Federation does not imply approval by international regulatory agencies, such as the U.S. Food and Drug Administration or the European Medicines Agency.

== Clinical trial registration and design ==
According to information published in a Russian national clinical research database and by the National Medical Research Radiological Center of the Ministry of Health of the Russian Federation, a Phase I study is being carried out within the Russian Federation and recruited 48 adult patients with advanced solid tumors for whom standard treatment options are no longer available. According to publicly available trial descriptions the trial is designed as an open-label, single-center study with dose escalation. Its primary objective is to evaluate the safety and tolerability of EnteroMix administered intravenously. Secondary objectives, as reported by the developers, include the assessment of pharmacokinetic parameters and exploratory evaluation of biological and clinical response markers. As of late 2025, EnteroMix was not listed in major international clinical trial registries such as ClinicalTrials.gov and did not have state registration or marketing authorization for routine medical use.

Subsequently, in May 2026, a new clinical trial entry for EnteroMix appeared in the international ClinicalTrials.gov registry, superseding or refining earlier descriptions. Russia's National Medical Research Radiological Centre (NMRRC) registered new human clinical trial for the EnteroMix formulation with 24 participants under the investigational code EM-I-2024.Clinical trial number NCT07584668 for "Safety, Tolerability and Pharmacokinetics of EM-I-2024" at ClinicalTrials.gov. The trial is an open-label, single-center, parallel-assignment Phase I study designed to evaluate the platform's safety profile, dose-dependent tolerability, and pharmacokinetics. It follows a standard 3+3 dose-escalation design common in early-phase oncology trials. The primary completion date is estimated for December 2026, with full study completion projected for February 2027.

=== Routes of administration ===
The trial partitions eligible adult patients into two parallel intervention cohorts based on tumor extent and clinical presentation:

- Intravenous (IV) cohort – patients with confirmed distant metastatic disease receive the multi-virus cocktail systemically to address disseminated lesions.
- Intra-arterial (IA) cohort – patients with massive locally advanced disease without distant metastases, or those with generalized disease showing an isolated progressive lesion, receive the formulation via intra-arterial infusion into the afferent artery of the tumor to maximize local viral concentration.

Tumor response, progression, and stabilization are monitored using standardized radiological criteria: RECIST 1.1 for general solid tumors and RANO criteria for neuro-oncological malignancies.

=== Dosing schedule and tracking ===
The trial evaluates three dosing schedules using a 3+3 dose-escalation design:

- Single administration at three dose levels: 0.5 × 10⁶, 5 × 10⁶, and 5 × 10⁷ PFU/kg (plaque-forming units per kilogram of body weight).
- Double administration (10-day interval) at the optimal dose determined from the first stage.
- Triple administration (10-day interval) at the same optimal dose.

The primary outcome measure is the quantitative pharmacokinetic tracking of the viral drug load in patients' peripheral blood over time to map systemic clearance and replication kinetics.

=== Eligibility criteria ===
Participants must meet stringent physiological and hematological thresholds, reflecting the trial's role as a terminal salvage therapy for patients with advanced solid tumors.

Inclusion criteria include:

- Age 18–75 years, ECOG performance status 0–2, and life expectancy of at least 3 months.
- Histologically confirmed solid tumor for which surgical resection is contraindicated and all established lines of pharmacological and radiotherapeutic interventions have been exhausted.
- Adequate bone marrow function: hemoglobin ≥ 90 g/L, absolute neutrophil count ≥ 1,500/mm³, and platelet count ≥ 100,000/mm³.
- Adequate renal function: glomerular filtration rate (CKD‑EPI formula) ≥ 60 mL/min/1.73 m².
- Adequate liver function and coagulation: serum bilirubin < 1.5× upper limit of normal (ULN); AST/ALT < 2.5× ULN (< 5× ULN if liver metastases present); Quick's prothrombin time > 55%.
- Women and men of reproductive potential must use highly effective contraception (intrauterine devices, oral contraceptives, contraceptive patches, long-acting injectable contraceptives, or double-barrier method) during the study and for at least 62 days after the last dose.

Key exclusion criteria include active HIV infection, pregnancy or breastfeeding, and documented disease progression per RECIST 1.1 or RANO criteria. Patients may also be discontinued if they withdraw consent or if the investigator judges that continued participation is no longer in the patient's best medical interest.

== Related and conceptually similar oncolytic virus platforms ==
Although some of the viruses reported to be included in EnteroMix share names with viruses used in other oncolytic virus platforms—such as Echovirus 7 and Coxsackievirus A21—their genetic identity with these reference strains has not been independently verified. Full nucleotide sequences of the viral strains used in EnteroMix were not identified in open databases, which precludes direct comparison with clinically studied CVA21 variants (e.g., V937), the Latvian "Rigvir" strain (ECHO-7), or other historical isolates. Consequently, the platforms described below are considered conceptually related, rather than direct analogues of the viral components used in EnteroMix. In addition, all of the examples below involve monoviral oncolytic therapies rather than multivirus formulations.

=== Echovirus 7 in oncolytic virotherapy ===
In the 1960s–1970s, a Latvian research group led by Aina Muceniece adapted an Echovirus 7 isolate for oncolytic virotherapy (trade-marked Rigvir), leading to the development of the drug Rigvir, which was registered in Latvia in 2004 for the treatment of melanoma. Retrospective analyses suggested antitumor activity in some patient cohorts. Subsequent full-genome sequencing demonstrated that the Latvian ECHO-7 strain was phylogenetically distinct and carried unique mutations consistent with prolonged laboratory adaptation. In 2019, the State Agency of Medicines of Latvia suspended and later revoked Rigvir's registration due to discrepancies between the declared and measured viral content.

=== Clinical development of Coxsackievirus A21 (CVA21) ===
Coxsackievirus A21 (CVA21), also known as V937, is among the most extensively studied oncolytic enteroviruses. CVA21 utilizes ICAM-1 and CD55 (DAF) as cellular receptors, which has supported its investigation in tumors with elevated expression of these molecules, including non–muscle-invasive bladder cancer, melanoma, and other solid tumors. CVA21 has been evaluated in clinical studies conducted in the United States, the United Kingdom, and Australia, using intratumoral, intravesical, and intravenous administration, both as monotherapy and in combination with immune checkpoint inhibitors. Published Phase I–II studies reported viral replication within tumor tissue and activation of antitumor immune responses. Severe adverse events observed in combination regimens were generally attributed to accompanying immunotherapeutic agents rather than the virus itself.

=== PVSRIPO (oncolytic poliovirus with rhinovirus IRES) ===
PVSRIPO is considered conceptually related to the PV-Russo component described for EnteroMix, as both are derived from modified Sabin type 1 poliovirus strains incorporating alterations in the internal ribosome entry site (IRES) to reduce neurovirulence while retaining tumor tropism. PVSRIPO was developed at Duke University and contains the IRES of human rhinovirus 2 in place of the native poliovirus IRES. PVSRIPO has undergone Phase I clinical evaluation in patients with glioblastoma and demonstrated genetic stability, lack of neurotropism, and a favorable safety profile.

== Biosafety considerations and data availability ==
International regulatory authorities, including the U.S. Food and Drug Administration and the European Medicines Agency, generally require comprehensive data on genetic stability, attenuation, biodistribution, and viral shedding for replication-competent oncolytic viruses as part of biosafety assessment and regulatory review. In addition, within the framework of the Global Polio Eradication Initiative, the World Health Organization requires the publication of complete nucleotide sequences for genetically modified constructs derived from vaccine poliovirus strains. As of May 2026 full genomic sequences of the viral strains reported to be used in EnteroMix, as well as detailed preclinical data on laboratory attenuation, genetic stability, biodistribution, and viral shedding, had not been published in open scientific databases or in peer-reviewed international literature. The review published on Zenodo platform noted that, in the absence of publicly accessible data addressing these parameters, the biosafety profile of EnteroMix cannot currently be independently evaluated against the above international standards. The same review also identified potential risks of inter-viral recombination associated with the concurrent systemic administration of multiple replication-competent enteroviruses belonging to different species (e.g., Enterovirus B and Enterovirus C), emphasizing that such risks would typically require assessment through published genomic stability and viral shedding studies as generally required by international regulatory authorities including the U.S. Food and Drug Administration and the European Medicines Agency.

== Media coverage and public reception ==
EnteroMix has been described in some media reports and social media posts as a "cancer vaccine," with some sources claiming unusually high therapeutic effectiveness. For example, one headline stated that "Russia's EnteroMix cancer vaccine shows 100% efficacy in early trials". Several other online reports repeated similar claims of early trial success and high efficacy. In some instances, reports have inaccurately characterized EnteroMix as an mRNA-based therapy or conflated it with separate Russian oncology research programs involving personalized mRNA cancer vaccines. Independent fact-checking organizations have addressed widely circulated claims in late 2025, noting that statements regarding widespread clinical availability, complete cancer cures, or mRNA technology were unsupported and arose from conflation of multiple, distinct Russian cancer research initiatives.
