= Coxsackie =

Coxsackie may refer to:

- Town of Coxsackie, New York
  - Coxsackie (village), New York, located within the town of Coxsackie
- Coxsackievirus, any of a group of 23 Coxsackie A viruses and 6 Coxsackie B viruses
