= Hogle =

Hogle may refer to:

- James Hogle (born 1951), American biophysicist
- John F. Hogle, trader, namesake of Hogles Creek, Missouri, United States
- Kevin Hogle, a member of the now-defunct alternate rock band Moth and other bands
- Utah's Hogle Zoo, Salt Lake City, Utah, United States, on land donated by Mr. and Mrs. James A. Hogle

== See also ==
- Hogel, part of a light-field hologram
- Högel (disambiguation)
- Hoggle, a character from Labyrinth (1986 film)
