= Saumitra Das =

Indian microbiologist

- Born: 20 January 1962 (age 64); West Bengal, India
- Education: University of Calcutta; Indian Institute of Chemical Biology
- Known for: Studies on Hepatitis C virus and Coxsackievirus B3 RNA
- Awards: 2005 N-BIOS Prize; 2010 NASI-Raliance Platinum Jubilee Award; 2012 Ranbaxy Research Award
- Scientific career
- Fields: Molecular virology; Molecular biology
- Workplaces: Indian Institute of Science

Saumitra Das (born 20 January 1962) is an Indian microbiologist and a professor at the Department of Microbiology and Cell Biology of the Indian Institute of Science. Known for his studies in the fields of molecular virology and molecular biology, Das is an elected fellow of all the three major Indian science academies namely, the Indian Academy of Sciences, the National Academy of Sciences, India and the Indian National Science Academy. The Department of Biotechnology of the Government of India awarded him the National Bioscience Award for Career Development, one of the highest Indian science awards, for his contributions to biosciences in 2005.

== Biography ==
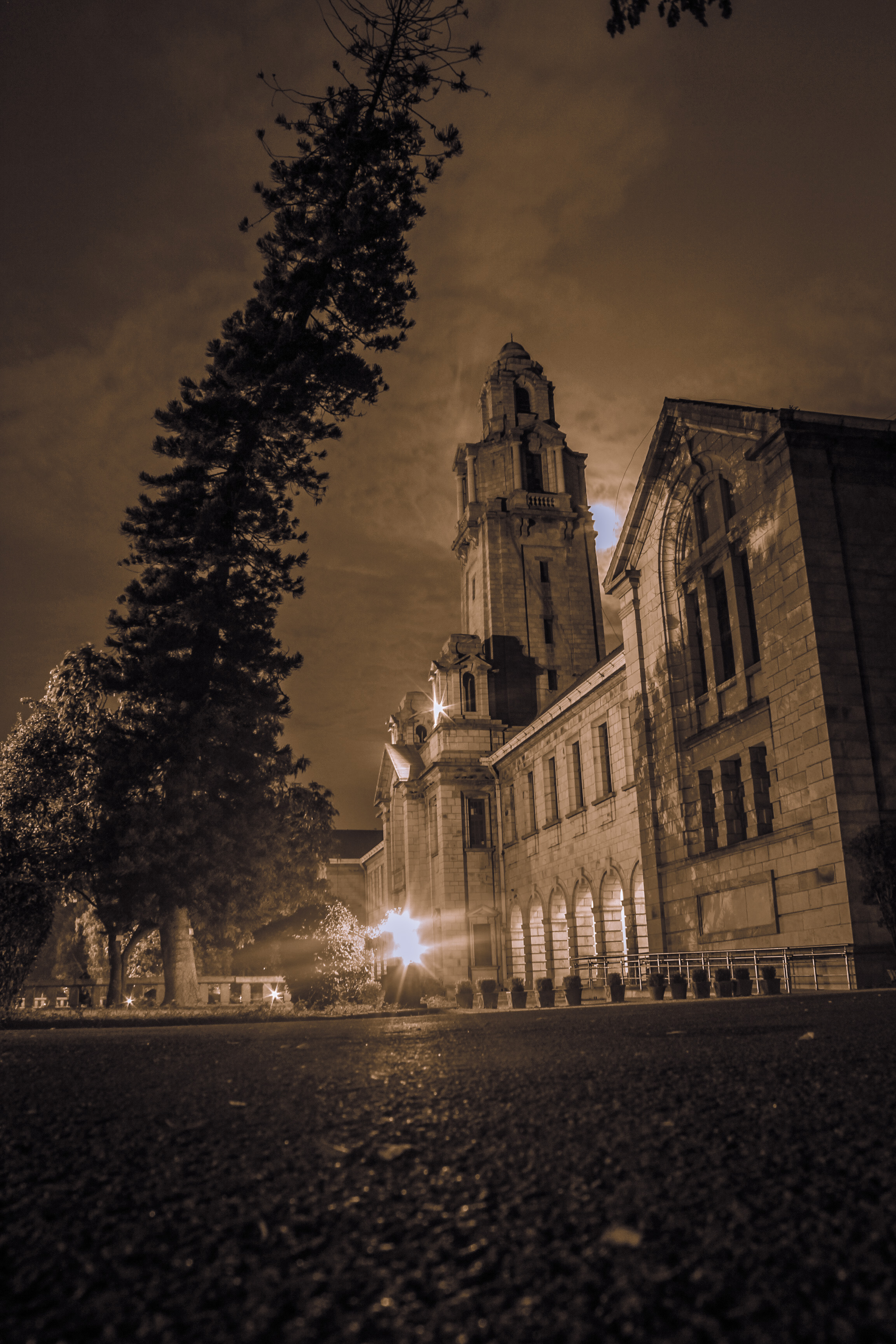
IISc Bangalore

Saumitra Das, born on 20 January 1962 in the Indian state of West Bengal, did his doctoral studies on the host-pathogen interaction of Leishmania donovani, an intracellular parasite which causes leishmaniasis, at the Indian Institute of Chemical Biology which earned him a PhD from the University of Calcutta in 1992. He continued his research on host-virus interactions during his post-doctoral days at the University of California, Los Angeles (UCLA) and after completion of the work, he joined the university in 1994 as an assistant research virologist. On his return to India in 1998, he joined the Indian Institute of Science (IISc) where he later became an associate professor and serves as a professor at the Department of Microbiology and Cell Biology. He also coordinates the functioning of the Centre of Excellence for Research on Hepatitis C virus, a research arm of the Department of Biotechnology housed in IISc campus.

Das resides in the New Housing Colony of the Indian Institute of Science in Bengaluru, Karnataka.

== Legacy ==
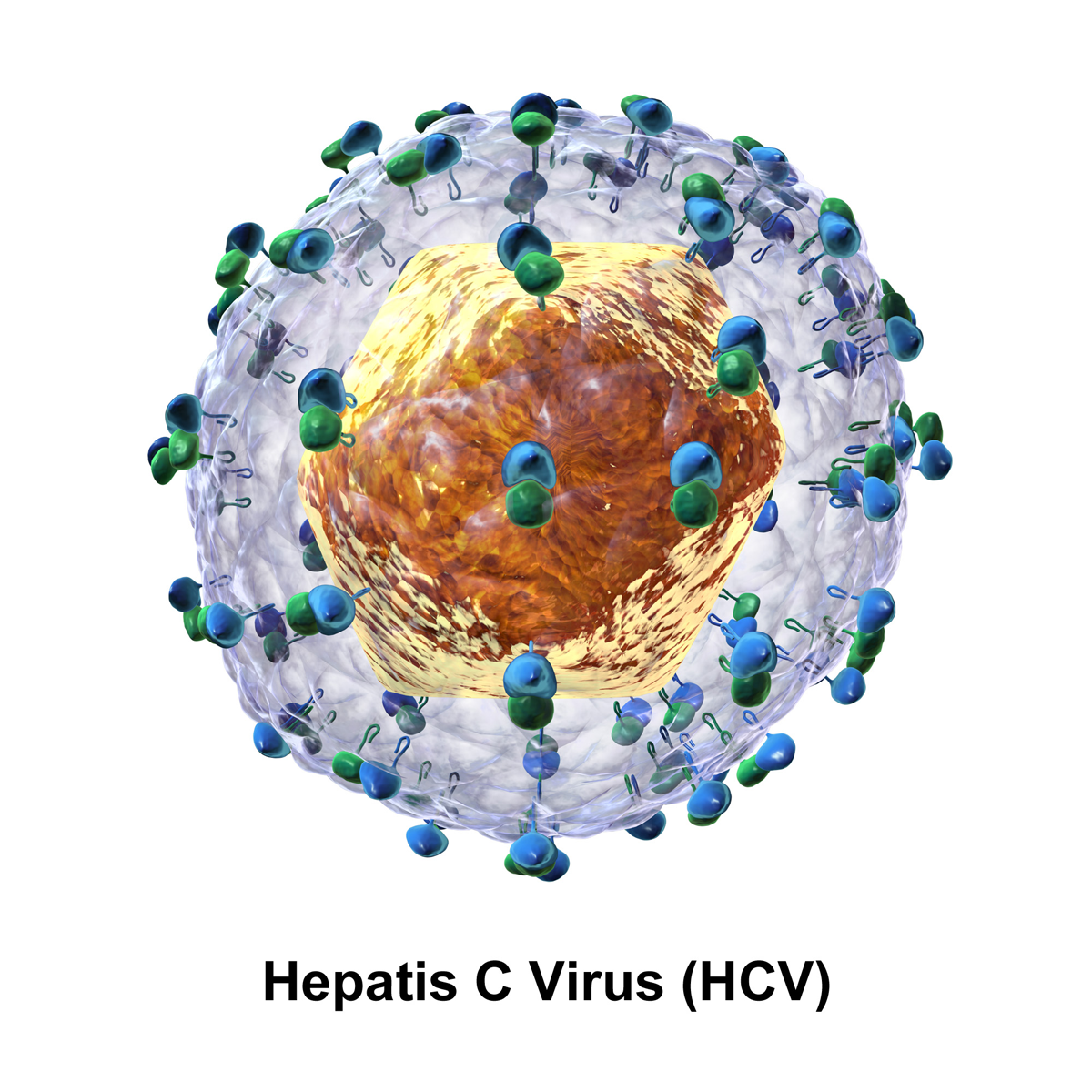
Hepatitis C virus - electron micrograph.

The microbiological research of Saumitra Das covered the fields of molecular virology and molecular biology. During his post-doctoral days at UCLA, Das identified I-RNA, a small RNA molecule isolated from the yeast species of Saccharomyces cerevisiae and demonstrated its antiviral activity against viruses that cause polio and hepatitis C. Later, at IISc, he focused on the translation of Hepatitis C Virus (HCV) and has done in vivo and in vitro experiments on the characterization of La, a cellular trans-acting factor. The team of scientists led by Das concentrates on the regulation of transcription and translation, especially hepatitis C virus and Coxsackievirus B3 RNA. The research conducted by Das, along with Anjali Anoop Karande (his colleague from the biochemistry department of IISc) and their teams were successful in the development of a vaccine for hepatitis C; the vaccine, a mixture of virus-like particles, worked by enveloping the HCV proteins. His studies have been documented by way of a number of articles (Note: Please see Selected bibliography section) and ResearchGate, an online repository of scientific articles has listed 111 of them. He and his colleagues hold several patents for the processes they have developed. He is also a member of the American Society of Virology and the American Society for Microbiology.

== Awards and honors ==
The Department of Biotechnology of the Government of India awarded him the National Bioscience Award for Career Development, one of the highest Indian science awards in 2005. The Indian Academy of Sciences elected him as a fellow in 2009, the same year as received the elected fellowship of National Academy of Sciences, India (NASI). The NASI honored him again a year later with the 2010 NASI-Raliance Platinum Jubilee Award. The Ranbaxy Science Foundation chose him for the Ranbaxy Research Award for medical research in 2012 and he received the elected fellowship of the Indian National Science Academy the same year. He was selected for the J. C. Bose National Fellowship of the Science and Engineering Research Board of the Department of Science and Technology in 2014.

== Selected bibliography ==
- Balakrishnan, Sreenath; Suma, M.s.; Raju, Shilpa R.; Bhargav, Santosh D.B.; Arunima, S.; Das, Saumitra; Ananthasuresh, G.k. (5 August 2015). "A Scalable Perfusion Culture System with Miniature Peristaltic Pumps for Live-Cell Imaging Assays with Provision for Microfabricated Scaffolds". BioResearch Open Access. 4 (1): 343–357. doi:10.1089/biores.2015.0024. PMC 4534047. PMID 26309810.
- Mansouri, Alireza; Karamchandani, Jason; Das, Sunit (2017). De Vleeschouwer, Steven (ed.). Molecular Genetics of Secondary Glioblastoma. Brisbane (AU): Codon Publications. doi:10.15586/codon.glioblastoma.2017.ch2. ISBN 9780994438126. PMID 29251857.
- Nath, Sayantan; Das, Sambuddha; Bhowmik, Aditi; Ghosh, Sankar Kumar; Choudhury, Yashmin (2019). "The GSTM1 and GSTT1 null genotypes increase the risk for Type 2 diabetes mellitus and the subsequent development of diabetic complications: A meta-analysis". Current Diabetes Reviews. 14 (1): 31–43. doi:10.2174/1573399814666171215120228. PMID 29243583. S2CID 23951314.

== See also ==
- Coxsackie B virus
- Coxsackievirus-induced cardiomyopathy
