= Virotherapy =

Treatment using biotechnology to convert viruses into therapeutic agents

- Specialty: Virology

Virotherapy is a treatment using biotechnology to convert viruses into therapeutic agents by reprogramming viruses to treat diseases. There are three main branches of virotherapy: anti-cancer oncolytic viruses, viral vectors for gene therapy and viral immunotherapy. These branches use three different types of treatment methods: gene overexpression, gene knockout, and suicide gene delivery. Gene overexpression adds genetic sequences that compensate for low to zero levels of needed gene expression. Gene knockout uses RNA methods to silence or reduce expression of disease-causing genes. Suicide gene delivery introduces genetic sequences that induce an apoptotic response in cells, usually to kill cancerous growths. In a slightly different context, virotherapy can also refer more broadly to the use of viruses to treat certain medical conditions by killing pathogens.

== History ==
Chester M. Southam, a researcher at Memorial Sloan Kettering Cancer Center, pioneered the study of viruses as potential agents to treat cancer.

== Oncolytic virotherapy ==
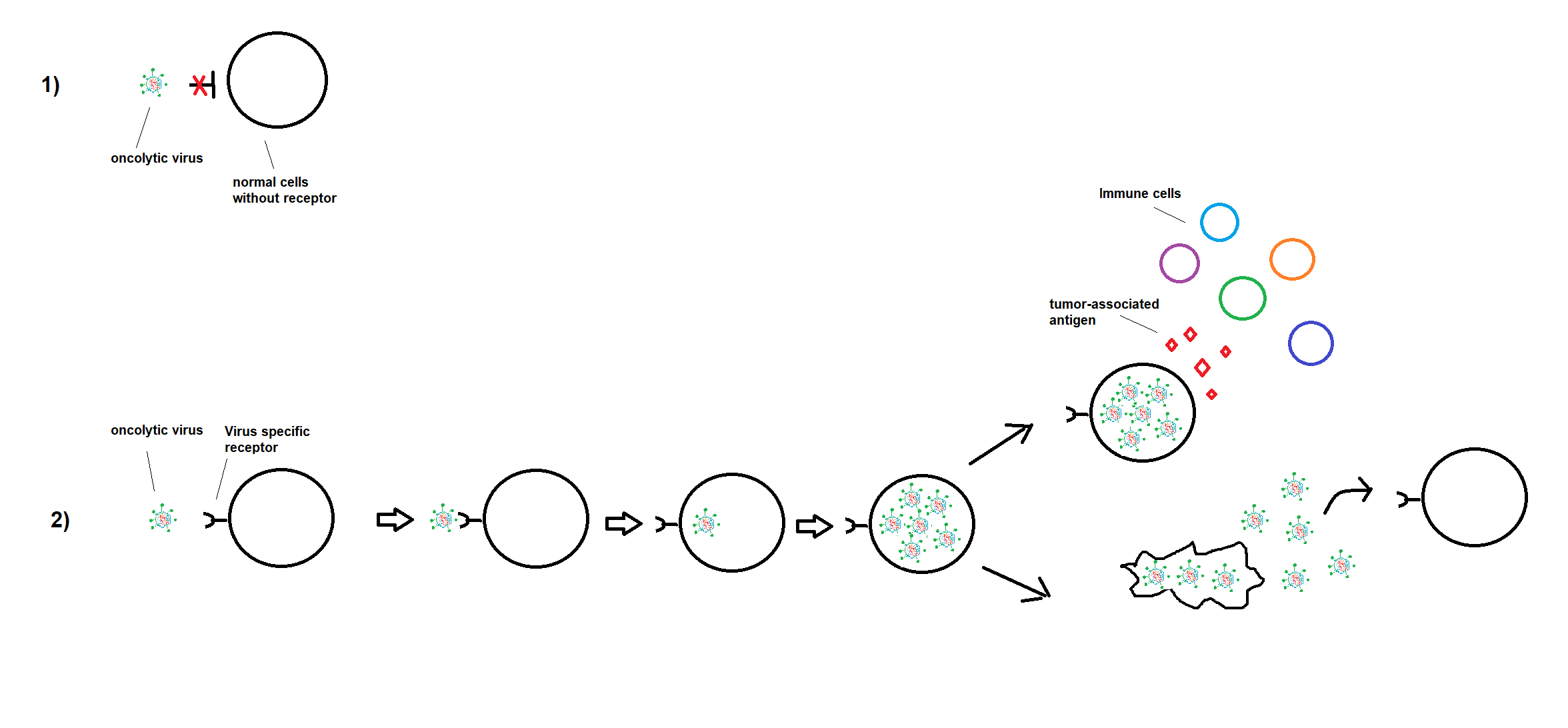
1) Oncolytic virus unable to enter cells without specific receptor. 2) Oncolytic virus is able to enter tumor cells with specific receptors where they replicate and lyse the cell as well as recruit other immune cells.

Oncolytic virotherapy is not a new idea – as early as the mid-1950s doctors were noticing that cancer patients who suffered a non-related viral infection, or who had been vaccinated recently, showed signs of improvement; this has been largely attributed to the production of interferon and tumour necrosis factors in response to viral infection, but oncolytic viruses are being designed that selectively target and lyse only cancerous cells.

In the 1940s and 1950s, studies were conducted in animal models to evaluate the use of viruses in the treatment of tumours. In the 1940s–1950s some of the earliest human clinical trials with oncolytic viruses were started.

=== Mechanism ===
It is believed that oncolytic virus achieve their goals by two mechanisms: selective killing of tumor cells as well as recruitment of host immune system. One of the major challenges in cancer treatment is finding treatments that target tumor cells while ignoring non-cancerous host cells. Viruses are chosen because they can target specific receptors expressed by cancer cells that allow for virus entry. One example of this is the targeting of CD46 on multiple myeloma cells by measles virus. The expression of these receptors are often increased in tumor cells. Viruses can also be engineered to target specific receptors on tumor cells as well. Once viruses have entered the tumor cell, the rapid growth and division of tumor cells as well as decreased ability of tumor cells to fight off viruses make them advantageous for viral replication compared to non-tumorous cells. The replication of viruses in tumor cells causes tumor cells to lyse killing them and also release signal to activate the host's own immune system, overcoming immunosuppression. This is done through the disruption of the microenvironment of the tumor cells that prevents recognition by host immune cells. Tumor antigens and danger-associated molecular patterns are also released during the lysis process which helps recruit host immune cells. Currently, there are many viruses being used and tested, all differing in their ability to lyse cells, activate the immune system, and transfer genes.

=== Clinical development ===
As of 2019, there are over 100 clinical trials looking at different viruses, cancers, doses, routes and administrations. Most of the work has been done on herpesvirus, adenovirus, and vaccinia virus, but other viruses include measles virus, coxsackievirus, polio virus, newcastle disease virus, and more. Methods of delivery tested include intratumoral, intravenous, intraperitoneal, and more. Types of tumor that are currently being study with oncolytic viruses include CNS tumors, renal cancer, head and neck cancer, ovarian cancer, and more. Oncolytic virotherapy as a monotherapy has also been tested in combination with other therapies including chemotherapy, radiotherapy, surgery, and immunotherapy.

==== Approved for clinical use ====
In 2015 the FDA approved the marketing of talimogene laherparepvec, a genetically engineered herpes virus, to treat melanoma lesions that cannot be operated on; as of 2019, it is the only oncolytic virus approved for clinical use. It is injected directly into the lesion. As of 2016 there was no evidence that it extends the life of people with melanoma, or that it prevents metastasis. Two genes were removed from the virus – one that shuts down an individual cell's defenses, and another that helps the virus evade the immune system – and a gene for human GM-CSF was added. The drug works by replicating in cancer cells, causing them to burst; it was also designed to stimulate an immune response but as of 2016, there was no evidence of this. The drug was created and initially developed by BioVex, Inc. and was continued by Amgen, which acquired BioVex in 2011. It was the first oncolytic virus approved in the West.

==== Others ====
RIGVIR is a virotherapy drug that was approved by the State Agency of Medicines of the Republic of Latvia in 2004. It is wild type ECHO-7, a member of echovirus family. The potential use of echovirus as an oncolytic virus to treat cancer was discovered by Latvian scientist Aina Muceniece in the 1960s and 1970s. The data used to register the drug in Latvia is not sufficient to obtain approval to use it in the US, Europe, or Japan. As of 2017 there was no good evidence that RIGVIR is an effective cancer treatment. On March 19, 2019, the manufacturer of ECHO-7, SIA LATIMA, announced the drug's removal from sale in Latvia, quoting financial and strategic reasons and insufficient profitability. However, several days later an investigative TV show revealed that State Agency of Medicines had run laboratory tests on the vials, and found that the amount of ECHO-7 virus is of a much smaller amount than claimed by the manufacturer. In March 2019, the distribution of ECHO-7 in Latvia has been stopped.

=== Challenges and future prospective ===
Although oncolytic viruses are engineered to specifically target tumor cells, there is always the potential for off-target effects leading to symptoms that are usually associated with that virus. The most common symptom that has been reported has been flu-like symptoms. The HSV virus used as an oncolytic virus has retained their native thymidine kinase gene which allows it to be targeted with antiviral therapy in the event of unwarranted side effects.

Other challenges include developing an optimal method of delivery either directly to the tumor site or intravenously and allowing for target of multiple sites. Clinical trials include the tracking of viral replication and spread using various laboratory techniques in order to find the optimal treatment.

Another major challenge with using oncolytic viruses as therapy is avoiding the host's natural immune system which will prevent the virus from infecting the tumor cells. Once the oncolytic virus is introduced to the host system, a healthy host's immune system will naturally try to fight off the virus. Because of this, if less virus is able to reach the target site, it can reduce the efficacy of the oncolytic virus. This leads to the idea that inhibiting the host's immune response may be necessary early in the treatment, but this is brought with safety concerns. Due to these safety concerns of immunosuppression, clinical trials have excluded patients who are immunocompromised and have active viral infections.

== Viral gene therapy ==
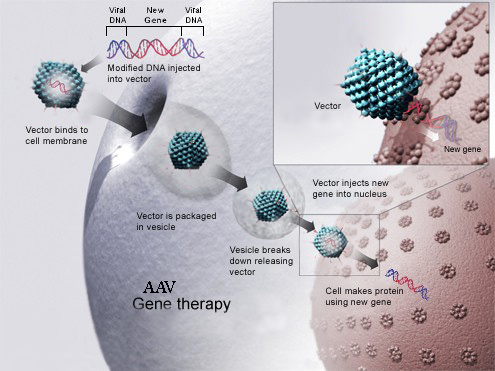
Viral gene therapy uses genetically engineered viral vectors to deliver a gene of interest to target cells. An AAV-based vector is shown in this example.

Viral gene therapy uses genetically engineered viral vectors to deliver therapeutic genes to cells with genetic malfunctions.

=== Mechanism ===
The use of viral material to deliver a gene starts with the engineering of the viral vector. Though the molecular mechanism of the viral vector differ from vector to vector, there are some general principles that are considered.

In diseases that are secondary to a genetic mutation that causes the lack of a gene, the gene is added back in. In diseases that are due to the overexpression of a gene, viral genetic engineering may be introduced to turn off the gene. Viral gene therapy may be done in vivo or ex vivo. In the former, the viral vector is delivered directly to the organ or the tissue of the patient. In the later, the desired tissue is first retrieved, genetically modified, and then transferred back to the patient. The molecular mechanisms of gene delivery and/or integration into cells vary based on the viral vector that is used. Rather than delivery of drugs that require multiple and continuous treatments. Delivery of a gene has the potential to create a long lasting cell that can continuously produce gene product.

=== Clinical development ===
There has been a few successful clinical use of viral gene therapy since the 2000s, specifically with adeno-associated virus vectors and chimeric antigen receptor T-cell therapy.

==== Approved for clinical use ====
===== Adeno-associated virus =====
Vectors made from Adeno-associated virus are one of the most established products used in clinical trials today. It was initially attractive for the use of gene therapy due to it not being known to cause any disease along with several other features. It has also been engineered so that it does not replicate after the delivery of the gene.

- In 2017, the FDA approved Spark Therapeutics' Luxturna, an AAV vector-based gene therapy product for the treatment of RPE65 mutation-associated retinal dystrophy in adults. Luxturna is the first gene therapy approved in the US for the treatment of a monogenetic disorder. It has been authorized for use in the EU since 2018.
- In 2019, the FDA approved Zolgensma, an AAV vector-based gene therapy product for the treatment of spinal muscular atrophy in children under the age of two. As of August 2019, it is the world's most expensive treatment, at a cost of over two million USD. Novartis is still seeking marketing approval for the drug in the EU as of 2019.

In additional, other clinical trials involving AAV-gene therapy looks to treat diseases such as Haemophilia along with various neurological, cardiovascular, and muscular diseases.

===== Chimeric antigen receptor T cells =====
Chimeric antigen receptor T cell (CAR T cell) are a type of immunotherapy that makes use of viral gene editing. CAR T cell use an ex vivo method in which T lymphocytes are extracted and engineered with a virus typically gammaretrovirus or lentivirus to recognize specific proteins on cell surfaces. This causes the T-lymphocytes to attack the cells that express the undesired protein. Currently two therapies, Tisagenlecleucel and Axicabtagene ciloleucel are FDA-approved to treat acute lymphoblastic leukemia and diffuse large B-cell lymphoma respectively. Clinical trials are underway to explore its potential benefits in solid malignancies.

==== Others ====
In 2012 the European Commission approved Glybera, an AAV vector-based gene therapy product for the treatment of lipoprotein lipase deficiency in adults. It was the first gene therapy approved in the EU. The drug never received FDA approval in the US, and was discontinued by its manufacturer uniQure in 2017 due to profitability concerns. As of 2019 it is no longer authorized for use in the EU.

=== Challenges and future prospective ===
Currently, there are still many challenges of viral gene therapy. Immune responses to viral gene therapies pose a challenge to successful treatment. However, responses to viral vectors at immune privileged sites such as the eye may be reduced compared to other sites of the body. As with other forms of virotherapy, prevention of off-target genome editing is a concern. In addition to viral gene editing, other genome editing technologies such as CRISPR gene editing have been shown to be more precise with more control over the delivery of genes. As genome editing become a reality, it is also necessary to consider the ethical implications of the technology.

== Viral immunotherapy ==
Viral immunotherapy is the use of virus to stimulate the body's immune system. Unlike traditional vaccines, in which attenuated or killed virus/bacteria is used to generate an immune response, viral immunotherapy uses genetically engineered viruses to present a specific antigen to the immune system. That antigen could be from any species of virus/bacteria or even human disease antigens, for example cancer antigens.

Vaccines are another method of virotherapy that use attenuated or inactivated viruses to develop immunity to disease. An attenuated virus is a weakened virus that incites a natural immune response in the host that is often undetectable. The host also develops potentially life-long immunity due to the attenuated virus's similarity to the actual virus. Inactivated viruses are killed viruses that present a form of the antigen to the host. However, long-term immune response is limited.

=== Cancer treatment ===
Viral immunotherapy in the context of cancer stimulates the body's immune system to better fight against cancer cells. Rather than preventing causes of cancer, as one would traditionally think in the context of vaccines, vaccines against cancer are used to treat cancer. The mechanism is dependent upon the virus and treatment. Oncolytic viruses, as discussed in previous section, is stimulate host immune system through the release of tumor-associated antigens upon lysis as well as through the disruption of the cancer's microenvironment which helps them avoid the host immune system. CAR T Cells, also mentioned in previous section, is another form of viral immunotherapy that uses viruses to genetically engineer immune cells to kill cancer cells.

== Other projects and products ==
=== Protozoal virotherapy ===
Viruses have been explored as a means to treat infections caused by protozoa. One such protozoa that potential virotherapy treatments have explored is Naegleria fowleri, which causes primary amebic meningoencephalitis (PAM). With a mortality rate of 95%, this disease-causing eukaryote has one of the highest pathogenic fatality rates known. Chemotherapeutic agents that target this amoeba for treating PAM have difficulty crossing blood-brain barriers. However, virulent viruses of protozoal pathogens (VVPPs) can be used as viral therapies that can more easily access this eukaryotic disease organism by crossing the blood-brain barrier in a process analogous to bacteriophages. These VVPPs would also be self-replicating and therefore require infrequent administration, with lower doses, thus potentially reducing toxicity. While these treatment methods for protozoal disease may show great promise in a manner similar to bacteriophage viral therapy, a notable hazard is the evolutionary consequence of using viruses capable of eukaryotic pathogenicity. VVPPs will have evolved mechanisms of DNA insertion and replication that manipulate eukaryotic surface proteins and DNA editing proteins. VVPP engineering must therefore control for viruses that may be able to mutate and thereby bind to surface proteins and manipulate the DNA of the infected host.

== See also ==
- Cancer
- Gene therapy
- Oncolytic virus
- Vector
- Virosome, using modified viruses for drug delivery
- Dog parasite press article
- EnteroMix
