= Coxsackie A virus =

Virus classification
- (unranked): Virus
- Realm: Riboviria
- Kingdom: Orthornavirae
- Phylum: Pisuviricota
- Class: Pisoniviricetes
- Order: Picornavirales
- Family: Picornaviridae
- Genus: Enterovirus
- Species: Enterovirus A
- Strain: Coxsackie A virus

Virus that causes hand, foot and mouth disease

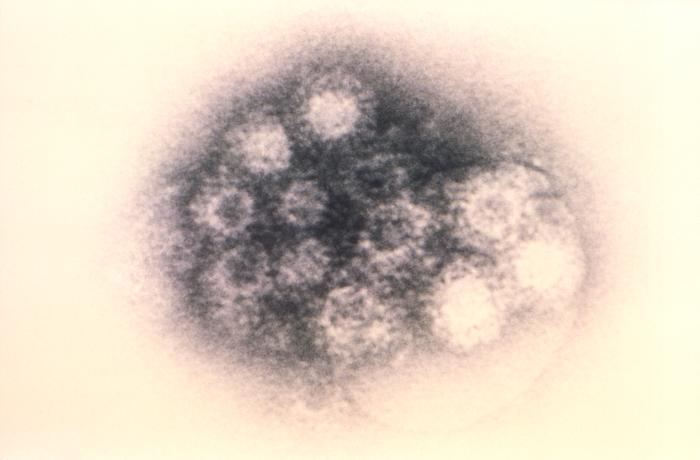
A transmission electron microscopic image depicting virions causing acute hemorrhagic conjunctivitis, primarily caused by two enteroviruses: enterovirus 70, and a variant of coxsackievirus A24.

Coxsackie A virus (CAV) is a cytolytic Coxsackievirus of the Picornaviridae family, an enterovirus (a group containing the polioviruses, coxsackieviruses, and echoviruses).

== Viral structure and genome ==
Coxsackie A virus is a subgroup of enterovirus A, which are small, non-enveloped, positive-sense, single-stranded RNA viruses. Its protective, icosahedral capsid has an external portion that contains sixty copies of viral proteins (VP1,-2,-3) and an internal portion surrounding the RNA genome containing sixty copies of VP4 viral proteins. This capsid mediates cell entry and elicits the humoral immune responses. Enteroviruses have a depression encircling each fivefold axis (canyon), which is their binding site for immunoglobulin-like receptors. This binding can trigger viral expansion and release of its genome.

A complete genome analysis of Coxsackie virus A2, A4, A5, and A10 strains isolated from individuals with hand-foot-mouth disease showed that natural recombination is frequent in the virus's evolution. Its strains in China were related to strains in Mongolia, Taiwan, likely to those that circulated in Europe, and form a distinct lineage from strains imported from Japan and South Korea.

== Replication cycle ==
Replication of the coxsackie virus happens through contributions of the host and virus components. The virus enters the cell where it is internalized into endoplasmic reticulum and the Golgi apparatus. After viral un-coating, viral RNA is released. Ribosomes on the rough endoplasmic reticulum translate the RNA into viral polyprotein. This polyprotein is processed into structural protein P1 and non-structural proteins P2 and P3. Via the virus-encoded proteinase, P1 is processed into the viral capsid subunit proteins VP0, -1, -3. The 5'-non-coding region contains sequences that control genome replication and translation, while the 3'-non-coding region contains polyA tail needed for virus infectivity.

== Diseases ==
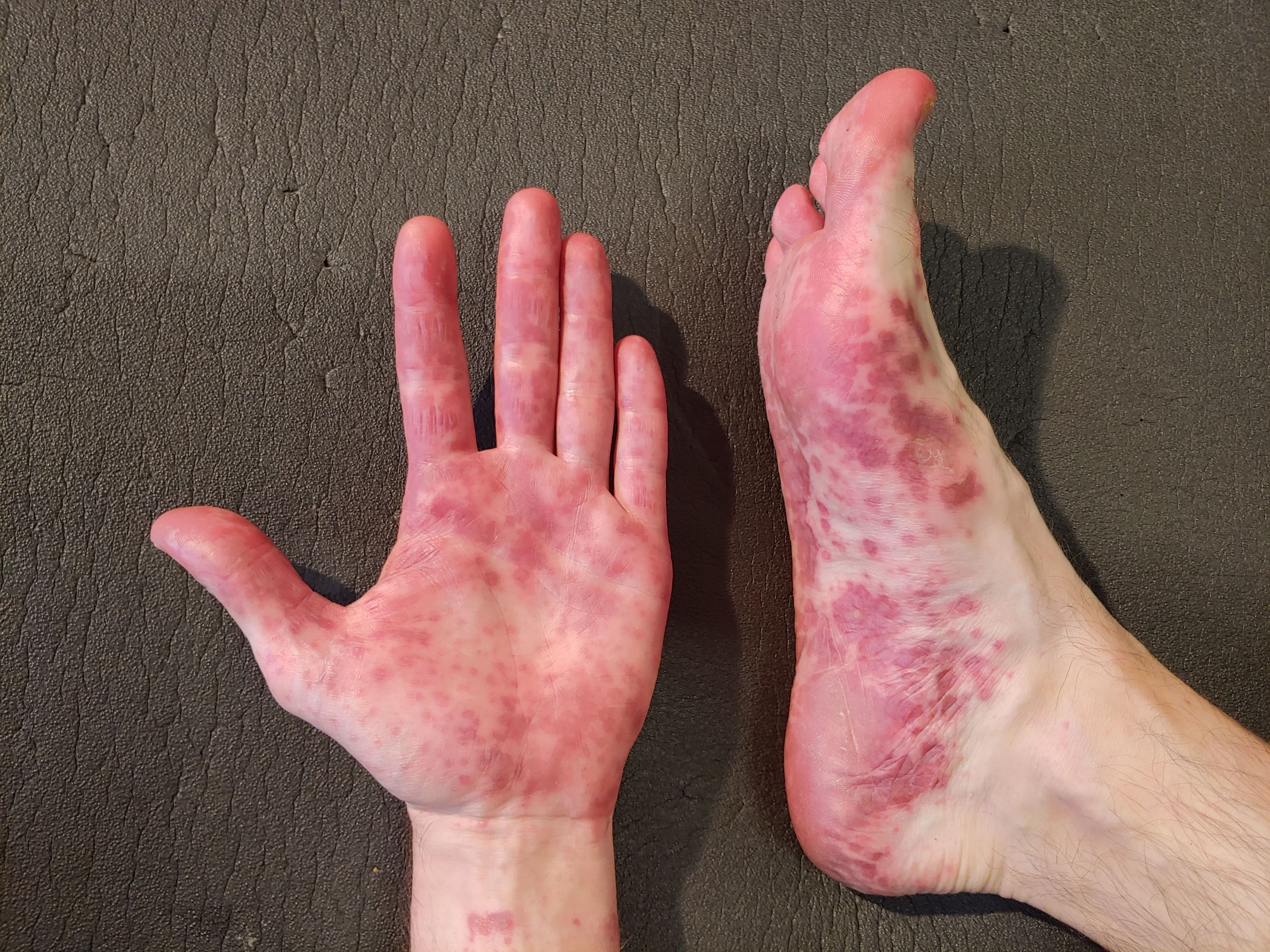
Coxsackievirus infection on skin of adult

The most well known Coxsackie A disease is hand, foot and mouth disease (unrelated to foot-and-mouth disease), a common childhood illness which affects mostly children aged 5 or under, often produced by Coxsackie A16. In most individuals, infection is asymptomatic or causes only mild symptoms. In others, infection produces short-lived (7–10 days) fever and painful blisters in the mouth (a condition known as herpangina), on the palms and fingers of the hand, or on the soles of the feet. There can also be blisters in the throat, or on or above the tonsils. Adults can also be affected. The rash, which can appear several days after high temperature and painful sore throat, can be itchy and painful, especially on the hands/fingers and bottom of feet.

Other diseases include acute haemorrhagic conjunctivitis (A24 specifically), herpangina, and aseptic meningitis (both Coxsackie A and B viruses). Coxsackievirus A7 is associated with neurological diseases and can cause paralytic poliomyelitis.

== Signs and symptoms ==
Coxsackie A virus leads to a number of diseases, however the most common signs and symptoms that appear with infection are fever and flu-like symptoms, mouth sores, and skin rashes. People who are infected may present with a mild fever and sore throat, and a general discomfort three to six days subsequent to exposure. Painful mouth sores (herpangina) may be present in the back of the mouth. These sores usually appear 24 hours after the flu like symptoms begin, and may blister, causing further discomfort when eating or drinking. A flat, red skin rash may appear, commonly accompanied by fluid filled blisters and scabbing. Rash will commonly present on the bottom of the feet, palm of hands, and other areas of the body, and persists upwards to ten days.

When the symptoms are incredibly severe, some may require hospitalization due to dehydration caused by inability to swallow food or water without pain, or seizures and convulsions can occur due to high fever. Signs of dehydration include dry skin, unintentional weight loss, or decreased urine output/darkened urine and if present should refer to a health care provider for intervention. Other serious complications include inflammatory brain conditions, such as viral meningitis or encephalitis, which require medical intervention. A professional health care may need to monitor if the someone infected is immunocompromised, or the symptoms do not improve within ten days.

The diagnosis of this disease centers around the appearance and behavior of fever, rash and mouth sores. Outside of the symptoms, age is also taken into consideration as the most common age of infection is under five years of age. A healthcare professional may choose to confirm the diagnosis through collecting samples from mouth sores and skin blisters, or a stool sample may also be ordered to rule out any other causes.

== Outbreaks ==
Since 2008, coxsackievirus A6 (CVA6) has been associated with several worldwide outbreaks of hand, foot and mouth disease (HFMD). In Finland, the initial HFMD case caused by the CVA6 lead to its identification of being the responsible pathogen of the outbreaks in Europe, North America, and Asia. Coxsackievirus A16 (CVA16) has also been linked to HFMD.

Outbreaks are more commonly seen amongst children (those seven and younger) compared to outbreaks rates amongst adults. Due to this, there are outbreaks within daycares, summer camps, and early autumn.

== Pregnancy ==
Serious pregnancy complications due to hand, foot, and mouth disease are rare due to its limited data. However, HFMD is concerning if the mother contracts the virus at the end of her pregnancy. CVA16 infection has been associated with third trimester massive perivillous fibrin deposition leading to intrauterine death. It has also led to first trimester spontaneous abortions. Overall, there is limited information about the Coxsackievirus A strain in pregnant women.

On the other hand, there has been some reports of the Coxsackievirus B (CVB) with regards to pregnant women. Contraction of the CVB are not associated with a higher risk of spontaneous abortions. Although, complications at the end of the pregnancy carries an increased risk of stillbirth or HFMD in the child. There have been reports of congenital heart defects and urogenital anomalies within the newborns of women who seroconverted to CVB during pregnancy. CVB is responsible for up to half of all individuals with pediatric myocarditis. In the past, it has been stated that newborns who have contracted CVB have a 75% mortality from myocarditis.

== Transmission ==
The modes of transmission of the Coxsackie virus is primarily through contact between people, respiratory droplets (fluid from coughing and sneezing), and contaminated surfaces. All age groups can become infected with the Coxsackie virus, however it occurs most frequently in young children under the age of 10 and in who have a weakened immune system.

The main ways the Coxsackie Virus spreads are:

- By direct transmission (when an infected person coughs or sneezes into any mucous membranes of the face i.e. eyes, nose, and mouth)
- Fecal-oral transmission (virus in the fecal matter of an infected individual end up in the mouth of another person)
- Via surface contact (when an infected person touches their face then a surface, the surface is contaminated with that virus. The next person comes along and touches the same surface then touches their face)
- Via airborne transmission (when an uninfected person inhales respiratory droplets of an infected person)

Although adults are less susceptible to infection, it is still possible for an adult to get infected with the Coxsackie virus. If a pregnant mother is infected, there is a 30-50% chance the infection will be passed on to the infant.

== Prevention ==
There is no vaccine to reduce the chances of infection and spread. It is critical to use non-pharmacological interventions to reduce the spread and transmission of Coxsackie virus. The best and most effective strategy for prevention is adopting proper hand hygiene, avoiding contact with the infected, abstain from touching mucous membranes of the face, and sanitizing frequently touched surfaces.

== Prognosis ==
Some of those who are infected with the Coxsackie virus may have complications that may lead to more serious issues. Complications include stomatitis, meningitis, pulmonary edema, myocarditis, pneumonia, and possibly spontaneous abortions.

== Treatment ==
Treatment is dependent on the disease process initiated by the virus. There is no known cure or vaccine against this virus.

Most Coxsackie A virus infections are mild and self-limiting meaning the infection has the ability to resolve on its own without requiring treatment. Symptoms of a Coxsackie A infection tend to dissipate on their own within 7–10 days. Treatment tends to focus on supportive care where the symptoms of the infection are targeted but not the virus itself. NSAIDs such as ibuprofen/naproxen and acetaminophen can be used to manage the flu-like symptoms, fever, and any other pain the infected individual may be feeling. Do not give a child aspirin as it may increase the risk of Reye syndrome. Fluids are recommended as to decrease the chances of dehydration. Mouth sores will make eating and drinking painful and may potentially lead to loss of appetite and refusing to eat in order to prevent mouth and throat pain. Severe dehydration may lead to hospitalization. Additionally, topical oral analgesic medications or salt water rinses can be used to help numb the sores and ease the throat pain. Since Coxsackie A is a viral infection, antibiotics will have no effect on the infection as they only work on bacterial infections.

== See also ==
- Bornholm disease
- Coxsackie B virus
