= Aina Muceniece =

Latvian immunologist

- Born: 23 March 1924; Katlakalns, Riga, Latvia
- Died: 14 February 2010 (aged 85); Jelgava, Latvia
- Education: Latvian State University, Faculty of Medicine
- Occupations: Scientist, inventor of RIGVIR

Aina Muceniece (23 March 1924 – 14 February 2010) was a Latvian immunologist and founder of practical cancer virotherapy who discovered that an echovirus might be a useful treatment for melanoma.

== Life and work ==
Aina Muceniece was born in Katlakalns, Latvia. Aina Muceniece is from a working-class family. She has said that hard work and life experience in poverty and hunger, have strengthened her for the future cause of life. A. Muceniece belonged to the ancient nation – Livs, where the roots go back into the 5,000 years of history and were described as a belligerent and brave nation. She graduated in 1941 from the Vilis Olavs School of Commerce in Riga, a private school of commerce for young women. She also worked as a nurse during World War II in Yaroslavl, USSR. After the war, she studied medicine at the Latvian State University, where she earned a doctor's degree in 1974. Muceniece achieved habilitation (Dr.habil.med.) in 1992.

Muceniece's scientific career began at the August Kirhenstein Institute of Microbiology, Latvian Academy of Sciences (Latvian: LZA Augusta Kirhenšteina Mikrobioloģijas institūts), first as a senior laboratory assistant, later as a senior research associate. Muceniece's laboratory started to study enteroviruses in the 1960s, and the research led to the identification of an echovirus that had possible use to treat melanoma, which became RIGVIR. Production and research was discontinued in 1999 and restarted after national registration in Latvia in 2004.

Muceniece also worked at the Pauls Stradiņš Hospital and the National Oncology Center as an immunology consultant from 1977 to 2003.

In 2002 she was made an honorary member of the Latvian Association of Oncologists. In 2005 Muceniece received the Cross of Recognition for meritorious service to the Republic of Latvia.

Before she died in 2010, she published 190 papers and three monographs.

== Remembrance and criticism of RIGVIR ==
On February 14, 2016, the Professor Aina Muceniece Virotherapy Foundation was established, which helps people around the world to receive virotherapy, as well as continues the special compensation system created by Professor Muceniece's family, ensuring the availability of RIGVIR to Latvians with significant discounts.

In 2017, the organizations of Latvian professional doctors, including the Latvian Association of Oncologists, request to remove the preparation “RIGVIR” from the list of reimbursable medicinal products and cancel the registration of the preparation in the State Register of Medicinal Products. The justification was that the studies and publications on which RIGVIR is based are of poor quality.

In March 2019, after repeated testing of the preparation “RIGVIR”, a discrepancy was found between the content specified by the manufacturer and the content of the samples submitted for analysis. Therefore, a decision has been made to ban the marketing of RIGVIR in Latvia and to remove it from the list of reimbursable medicines.
