= ECHO-7 =

Group of viruses

ECHO-7 (trade name Rigvir) is a wild type member of the echovirus group of viruses. It was formerly approved as a virotherapy medication by the State Agency of Medicines of the Republic of Latvia (2004–19). In March 2019, laboratory tests found the medicine to contain far smaller quantities of ECHO-7 virus than its manufacturer claimed. On May 31, 2019, the State Agency of Medicines suspended the registration licence of ECHO-7.

== History ==
The potential use of echovirus as an oncolytic virus to treat cancer was discovered by Latvian scientist and immunologist Aina Muceniece in the 1960s and 1970s. The virus was obtained from intestinal tract of a healthy children and has not been genetically modified. She was an honorary member of the Latvian Association of Oncologists and the founder of The Aina Muceniece Virotherapy Foundation.

== Approval ==
The data used to register the drug in Latvia is not sufficient to obtain approval to use it in the US, Europe, or Japan. As of 2017 there was no good evidence that ECHO-7 is an effective cancer treatment.

Oncologists and other medical experts in Latvia have repeatedly expressed the concern for the lack of clinical trials and evidence of efficacy, as well as unethical advertising. Oncologist David Gorski has written that "There are many aspects to the RIGVIR story that strongly suggest that RIGVIR is probably cancer quackery" citing the "mysterious creator" aspect, the misleading description of the product as "natural" and the use of testimonials to market it.

In February 2017, the Association of Oncologists, Association of Chemotherapists, Association of Rare Diseases of Latvia, and the Head of Pharmacology Department of Riga Stradiņš University submitted a request to the Ministry of Health of Latvia, State Agency of Medicines, and National Health Service requesting the removal of ECHO-7 from the Register of Medicines of Latvia and from the list of state-compensated medicines. A revision of clinical treatment guidelines for melanoma was also requested. The request was based on the analysis of available research and suggests that there is no conclusive evidence for the efficacy of RIGVIR as a cancer treatment. In 2017 the Health Ministry of Latvia responded that RIGVIR would remain on its medicines register, and that in its judgement the risk-benefit ratio for RIGVIR as acceptable. At the end of 2018, Commission of Social and Labor Affairs of Latvian Parliament started a discussion about possible exclusion of RIGVIR from the list of state-compensated medicines and the Register of Medicines of Latvia.

On March 19, 2019, the manufacturer of ECHO-7, SIA LATIMA, announced the drug's removal from sale in Latvia, quoting financial and strategic reasons and insufficient profitability. However, several days later an investigative TV show revealed that State Agency of Medicines had run laboratory tests on the vials, and found that the amount of ECHO-7 virus is of a much smaller amount than claimed by the manufacturer. According to agency's lab director, "It's like buying what you think is lemon juice, but finding that what you have is lemon-flavored water". In March 2019, the distribution of ECHO-7 in Latvia has been stopped. ECHO-7 has also been removed from the list of state-reimbursed medications. On May 31, 2019, the registration licence of ECHO-7 was suspended in Latvia. According to Baltic News Network, "State Agency for Medicines (SAM) has decided to halts registration of Rigvir medication, until all problems have been resolved". It also reported "more than 30 patients, five healthcare institutions and 16 oncologists have turned to the Health Inspectorate with a request to permit them to continue therapy using Rigvir. In response to requests, HI permitted distribution of a single type of Rigvir medication for patients, who are already undergoing melanoma treatment".

According to Solvita Olsena, expert in patient safety at the University of Latvia, people who have used ECHO-7 should contact the police, as facts indicate that a criminal offence has occurred. According to Olsena, police has the duty to protect people; it is a dangerous precedent when people receive medicines that do not contain the substance which should be present. A member of Latvian parliament and advisor to the Prime Minister, Renars Putnins, also has called the entire thing an affair and has asked for an official investigation.

== Advertising ==
In Latvia manufacturers of ECHO-7 have a history of receiving fines for off-label marketing this anti-cancer drug directly to general public and cancer patients. However, on October 31, 2018 the Regional Administrative Court of Latvia canceled the sanction imposed by the local Health Inspectorate for the unauthorized off-label advertising.

== See also ==
- List of unproven and disproven cancer treatments
- EnteroMix
