= SCAR-Fc =

- Other names: Soluble receptor analogue

sCAR-Fc (Soluble Receptor Analogue) is an experimental prophylactic treatment against coxsackievirus B3 (CVB) infections. Coxsackievirus B3 can cause cardiac damage, eventually resulting in a weakened and enlarged heart that is termed dilated cardiomyopathy. While many other treatments inhibit viral proliferation in myocytes, sCAR-Fc prevents the virus entering the cell by competitively binding to coxsackie virus and adenovirus receptors (CAR) on the membrane of myocytes.

== Myocarditis ==
Coxsackievirus B3 is a single-stranded RNA enterovirus and a member of the Picornavirdae family. Once the virus penetrates the host's systemic circulation via contaminated water or food, it can travel and infect the heart and cause myocarditis. Myocarditis is an inflammation of the heart, most commonly cause by viral infections. Amongst the viruses capable of causing myocarditis, CVB3 is a common agent identified in inducing cardiac damage. Internalization of the virus into myocytes occurs by binding to coxsackievirus-adenovirus receptors (CAR) located in tight junctions on cell membranes. Once inside the cytoplasm, the virus can use the host's ribosomal machinery to proliferate and replicate progenies for further infection. Extensive cardiac necrosis can occur by day three after infection as incubated viruses lyse myocytes, resulting in severe and rapid cardiac decompensation. With loss of cardiac cells increasing progressively, infected individual will experience abnormalities in left ventricular systolic and diastolic function, as well as electrical conduction defects manifesting as cardiac dysrhythmias. As a result, ejection fraction decreases substantially. The cytolytic destruction of heart cells can lead to dilated cardiomyopathy if not treated appropriately.

The role of the immune system in response to the presence of a virus has both beneficial and detrimental effects on the cardiac system. The arrival of natural killer cells (NK cells) at the site of infection limits viral proliferation in myocytes. Conversely, while certain cytokines released from immune cells have protective effects, others such as tumor necrosis factor-alpha (TNFα) have deleterious effects on heart cells. Moreover, peak concentrations of T cells in the myocardium during days 7-14 play important roles in both viral clearance and immune mediated cardiac damage. T-cells not only lyse and destroy infected myocytes, but due to molecular mimicry, they also destroy normal, healthy cardiac cells, further driving the heart towards dilated cardiomyopathy.

== Mechanism ==
A synthetic and soluble form of CAR (sCAR) has been created to prevent viral infection with CVB3. Attaching Fc domain of immunoglobulin IgG1 to sCAR (sCAR-Fc) enhances solubility and extends its half-life. Furthermore, once sCAR-Fc binds the virus, macrophages and other phagocytic immune cells with Fc receptor recognition bind to the sCAR-Fc-viral complex to eliminate the virus. Essentially, sCAR-Fc mimics CAR receptors on cardiac cells, competitively inhibiting viral attachment and entry into myocytes. Decreased lesions in cardiac tissues, reduced cell necrosis, and diminished inflammatory responses are observed in sCAR-Fc treated cells (CITE). This suggests protective effects against myocardial damage by CVB3.

Conformational changes in a viral particle (A-particle) with sCAR-Fc-virus binding causing the loss of the virus’ internal capsid protein, VP4. This irreversible reaction prevents the virus from interacting with cellular receptors (CAR) on cardiac cells, decreasing infectivity of CVB3.

== Administration ==
Administration of sCAR-Fc beyond three days after initial exposure to the virus does not have any beneficial effects as cardiac damage is too severe. As such, the use of sCAR-Fc is currently limited to prophylactic treatments.
