= Viral cardiomyopathy =

- Specialty: Cardiology
- Symptoms: thickening of the myocardium; dilation of the ventricles
- Causes: viral infections cause myocarditis
- Diagnostic method: Electrocardiography, Echocardiography, MRI

Viral cardiomyopathy occurs when viral infections cause myocarditis with a resulting thickening of the myocardium and dilation of the ventricles. These viruses include Coxsackie B and adenovirus, echoviruses, influenza H1N1, Epstein–Barr virus, rubella (German measles virus), varicella (chickenpox virus), mumps, measles, parvoviruses, yellow fever, dengue fever, polio, rabies, and the viruses that cause hepatitis A and C, as well as COVID-19, which has been seen to cause this in persons otherwise thought to have a "low risk" of the virus's effects.

== COVID-19 Cardiomyopathy ==
Patients with COVID-19 frequently experience heart issues. According to studies, people who have had previous cardiovascular conditions like cardiomyopathy, hypertension, coronary heart disease, or arrhythmia are more likely to become critically ill from SARS-CoV-2 infection. Myocarditis may result from a direct viral infection of the myocardium. Cardiovascular biomarkers like troponin, lactate dehydrogenase, high sensitivity amino-terminal B-type natriuretic peptide, creatinine kinase, and creatinine kinase myocardial band, which indicate myocardial damage, increase in concentration in response to COVID-19. Hundreds of studies have reported myocarditis/myopericarditis caused by COVID-19 infection in living patients, with a male predominance (58%), and a median age of 50 years.

== See also ==
- Coxsackievirus-induced cardiomyopathy
- Myocarditis
- Pericarditis
- Vaccine adverse event
