= James Hogle =

American biophysicist

James Martin Hogle
- Born: July 16, 1951 (age 75); Detroit, United States
- Education: University of Wisconsin–Madison; University of Minnesota Twin Cities
- Known for: poliovirus structure
- Scientific career
- Fields: Biophysics
- Workplaces: Harvard University; Scripps Research Institute

James Martin Hogle (born July 16, 1951) is an American biophysicist who discovered the structure of poliovirus in 1985. He is an emeritus Edward S. Harkness Professor at Harvard Medical School where he was also Chair of the Biophysics Program, as well as a faculty dean for Dudley House and a faculty director at Peabody Terrace.

== Early life and education ==
Hogle was born in Detroit and grew up in Minneapolis, where he lived from the age of 9. After receiving a B.A. in biochemistry from the University of Minnesota, Hogle was accepted to both the oncology program and the biochemistry program at the University of Wisconsin–Madison, and chose biochemistry because he was "afraid (oncology) might be too specialized." He interviewed virologist Roland Rueckert, who was not available at the time, and did a summer rotation in the laboratory of pioneering X-ray crystallographer Muttaiya Sundaralingam, where he was "immediately hooked" on crystallography. Hogle worked on a number of projects at this lab, and developed an interest in virology. As a postdoctoral student working in Stephen C. Harrison's lab at Harvard, he worked on the structure of turnip crinkle virus and tomato bushy stunt virus, and began investigating poliovirus structure.

== Academia ==
At Scripps Research Institute, Hogle used a three-pronged approach to determine the poliovirus structure: electron microscopy, direct methods, and the heavy atom method. In 1985, at the age of 35, he succeeded in determining the structure of poliovirus using X-ray crystallography.

Hogle went to Harvard Medical School in 1991, continuing to work on polio and its close relatives such as herpes simplex virus as well as echovirus and other picornaviruses. His lab had two major areas of focus: structural and biochemical characterization of the cell entry pathway of polio and related viruses, and structural characterization of components of the Herpes virus replication complex and nuclear egress complex.

He retired in 2019.
