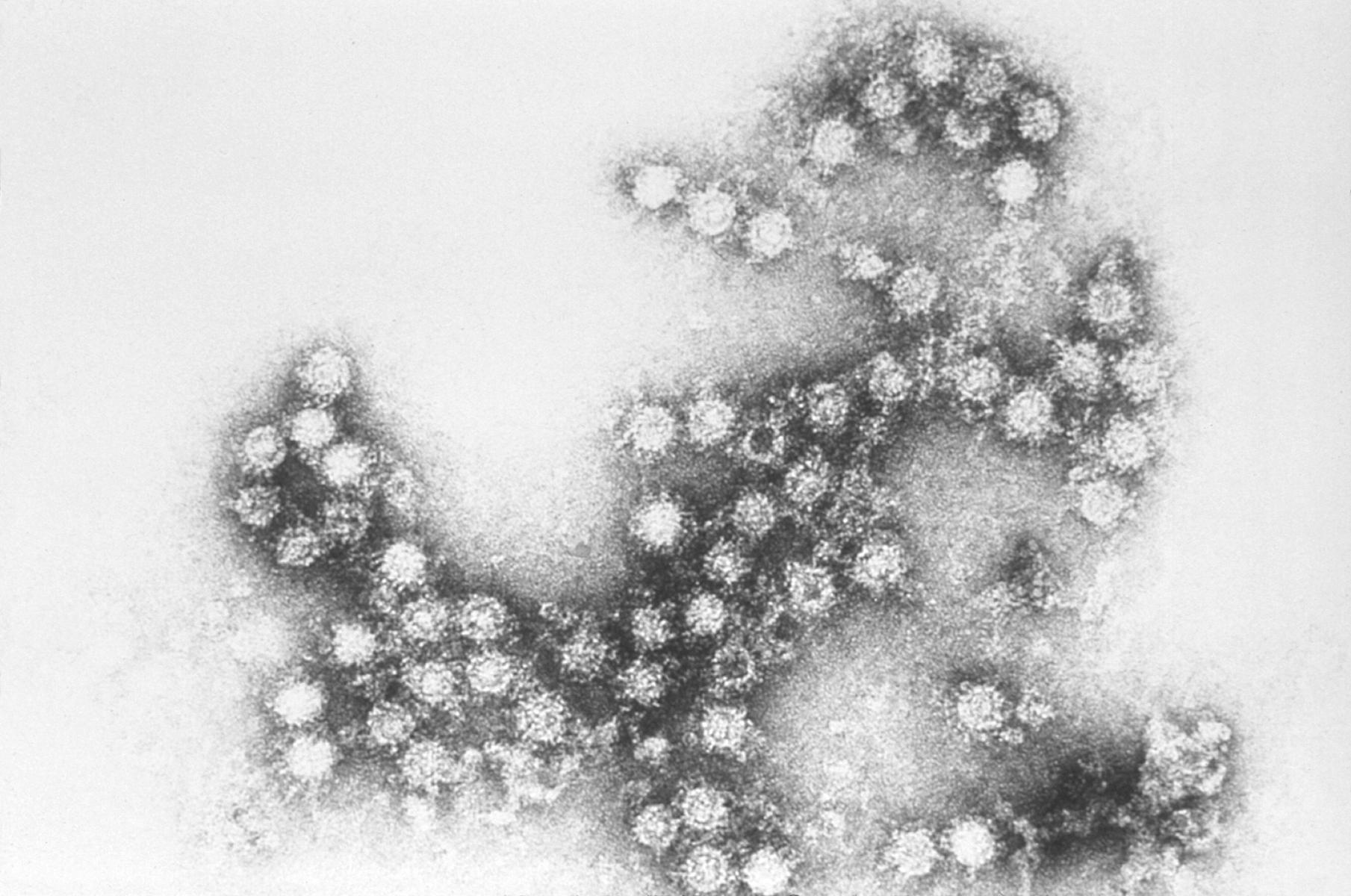
- Coxsackie B4 virus

Virus classification
- (unranked): Virus
- Realm: Riboviria
- Kingdom: Orthornavirae
- Phylum: Pisuviricota
- Class: Pisoniviricetes
- Order: Picornavirales
- Family: Picornaviridae
- Genus: Enterovirus
- Species: Enterovirus B
- Strain: Coxsackie B virus

= Coxsackie B virus =

Virus that causes fever and sometimes heart damage

Coxsackie B is a group of six serotypes of coxsackievirus (CVB1-CVB6), a pathogenic enterovirus, that trigger illnesses ranging from a mild febrile rash to full-fledged pericarditis and myocarditis (coxsackievirus-induced cardiomyopathy).

The genome of the Coxsackie B virus consists of approximately 7,400 base pairs.

== Geographic distribution ==
The various members of the Coxsackie B group were discovered almost entirely in the United States, appearing originally in Connecticut, Ohio, New York, and Kentucky, although a sixth member of the group has been found in the Philippines. However, all six serotypes have a global distribution and are a relatively common cause of gastrointestinal upset. The name reflects the first isolation from Coxsackie, New York.

== Transmission ==
Infections are most commonly spread by the fecal–oral route, emphasizing the importance of good hygiene, especially hand-washing. Oral-oral and respiratory droplets can also be means of transmission.

== Epidemiology ==
Coxsackie B infections have been reported to account for nearly a quarter of all enterovirus infections. Nearly half of all reported cases of Coxsackie B infections occur before the age of five. For the CBV1 serotype, two-thirds of Centers for Disease Control and Prevention reported infections in the United States were for children under one year of age.

== Signs and symptoms ==
Signs and symptoms of infection with viruses in the Coxsackie B grouping include fever, headache, sore throat, gastrointestinal distress, extreme fatigue, as well as chest and muscle pain. It can also lead to spasms in arms and legs. This presentation is known as pleurodynia or Bornholm disease in many areas. Patients with chest pain should see a doctor immediately—in some cases, viruses in the Coxsackie B family progress to myocarditis or pericarditis, which can result in permanent heart damage or death. Coxsackie B virus infection may also induce aseptic meningitis. As a group, they are the most common cause of unexpected sudden death, and may account for up to 50% of such cases. The incubation period for the Coxsackie B viruses ranges from 2 to 6 days, and illness may last for up to 6 months in extreme cases, but may resolve as quickly as two days. Infection usually occurs between May and June, but does not show symptoms until October in temperate Northern Hemisphere regions. People should ideally spend 1 month resting during the height of infection. Another cause of this virus is a dirty wound from an accident.

== Diagnosis ==
Enterovirus infection is diagnosed mainly via serological tests such as ELISA and from cell culture. Because the same level and type of care is given regardless of the type of Coxsackie B infection, it is mostly unnecessary for treatment purposes to diagnose which virus is causing the symptoms in question, though it may be epidemiologically useful.

== Pathology ==
Coxsackie B infections usually do not cause serious disease, although for newborns in the first 1–2 weeks of life, Coxsackie B virus infections can be fatal. The pancreas is a frequent target, which can cause pancreatitis.

Coxsackie B3 (CB3) infections are the most common enterovirus cause of myocarditis and sudden cardiac death. CB3 infection causes ion channel pathology in the heart, leading to ventricular arrhythmia. Studies in mice suggest that CB3 enters cells by means of toll-like receptor 4. CB3 is more virulent among people with selenium deficiency, causing a congestive cardiomyopathy known as Keshan disease endemic in selenium-deficient areas of China.

Both CB3 and CB4 exploit cellular autophagy to promote replication.

=== Diabetes ===
The B4 Coxsackie viruses (CB4) serotype was suggested to be a possible cause of diabetes mellitus type 1 (T1D). An autoimmune response to Coxsackie virus B infection upon the islets of Langerhans may be a cause of T1D.

Other research implicates strains B1, A4, A2 and A16 in the destruction of beta cells, with some suggestion that strains B3 and B6 may have protective effects via immunological cross-protection.

=== Persistent (non-cytolytic) infection ===
Enteroviruses are usually only capable of acute infections that are rapidly cleared by the adaptive immune response. However, mutations which enterovirus B serotypes such as coxsackievirus B and echovirus acquire in the host during the acute phase can transform these viruses into the non-cytolytic form (also known as non-cytopathic or defective enterovirus). This form is a mutated quasispecies of enterovirus which is capable of causing persistent infection in human tissues, and such infections have been found in the pancreas in type 1 diabetes, in chronic myocarditis and dilated cardiomyopathy, in valvular heart disease, in myalgic encephalomyelitis, and in Sjögren's syndrome. In these persistent infections, viral RNA is present at very low levels, and some researchers believe it is just a fading remnant of the acute infection although others scientists believe this persistent viral RNA may have pathological effects and cause disease.

== Treatment and Prevention ==
As of 2008, there is no well-accepted treatment for the Coxsackie B group of viruses. Palliative care is available, however, and patients with chest pain or stiffness of the neck should be examined for signs of cardiac or central nervous system involvement, respectively. Some prevention can usually be achieved with basic sanitation by food-service workers, though the viruses are highly contagious. Care should be taken in washing one's hands and in cleaning the body after swimming. In the event of Coxsackie-induced myocarditis or pericarditis, anti-inflammatories can be given to reduce damage to the heart muscle.
