= Katlakalns =

Neighbourhood of Riga, Latvia

Coordinates: 56°53′N 24°11′E

- Neighborhood of Riga
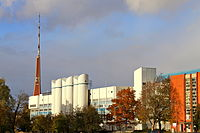
- The Riga Milk Factory in Katlakalns

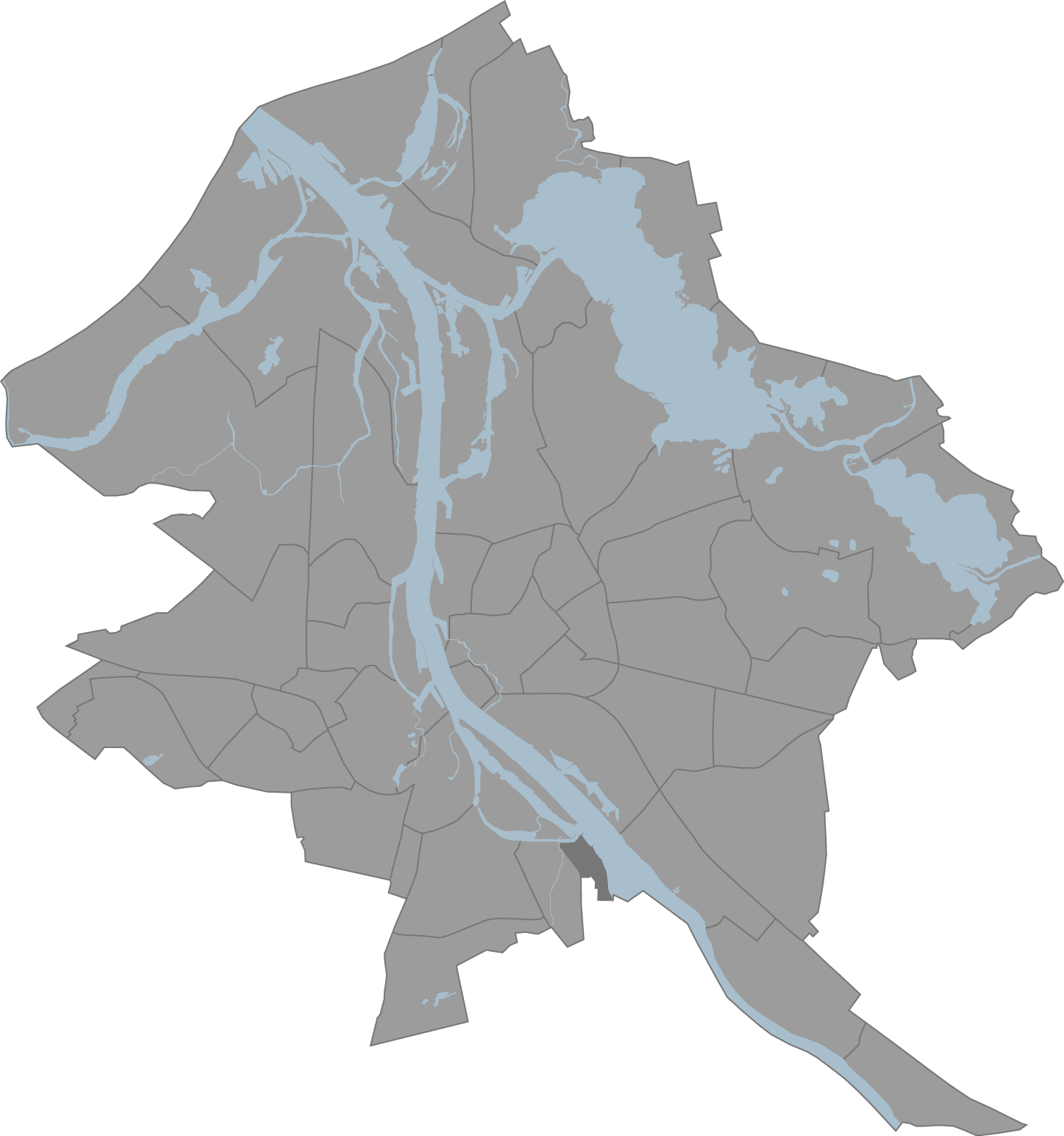
- Location in Riga
- Country: Latvia
- City: Riga
- District: Zemgale Suburb

Area
  - Total: 1.554 km^{2} (0.600 sq mi)

Population (2024)
  - Total: 154
  - Density: 99.1/km^{2} (257/sq mi)
- Time zone: UTC+2 (EET)
  - Summer (DST): UTC+3 (EEST)
- Website: apkaimes.lv

Katlakalns is a neighbourhood of Riga, the capital of Latvia. It is linked to Ķengarags and Maskavas forštate by the Southern Bridge erected in 2004-2008 and opened on November 17, 2008.

Katlakalns village of Ķekava parish also belongs to this neighborhood.

== Sources ==
- Jērāns, Pēteris (1988). Latvijas padomju enciklopēdija: Rīga. Rīga: Valērija Belokoņa izdevniecība. p. 733. ISBN 9984-9482-2-6.
