= Massive perivillous fibrin deposition =

Histological problem with the placenta leading to reduced foetal growth or miscarriage

- Other names: MPFD, MFD
- Specialty: Obstetrics, pathology
- Symptoms: none
- Causes: unknown, may be autoimmune
- Risk factors: previous MPFD
- Diagnostic method: histology of the placenta
- Treatment: none
- Prognosis: 33% premature birth, 31% neonatal death
- Frequency: 0.028% of all pregnancies, 18-50% recurrence in those affected

Massive perivillous fibrin deposition (MPFD, or MFD) refers to excessive deposition of fibrous tissue around the chorionic villi of the placenta. It causes reduced growth of the foetus, and leads to miscarriage in nearly 1 in 3 pregnancies affected. There are typically no symptoms, and it is rarely detected before birth. The cause is unknown, but may be autoimmune. Diagnosis is based on the histology (cell appearance) of the placenta. There are currently no known treatments. MPFD is very rare, but recurrence is around 18% in those affected.

== Signs and symptoms ==
There may be no symptoms of MPFD. Doppler ultrasound of the umbilical arteries may not detect reduced blood flow, particularly if a case is not severe.

== Cause ==
The cause of MPFD is unknown. Current theories suggest an autoimmune cause. It is associated with sepsis, intraventricular haemorrhage of the brain, and necrotising enterocolitis in the baby. It may also be linked to maternal syphilis infection, and antiphospholipid syndrome, among other conditions.

== Mechanism ==
MPFD is caused by deposition fibrous tissue around the chorionic villi of the placenta. The placenta often shows lesions upon histology and autopsy. The villi become trapped, causing avascular necrosis. This causes reduced substance exchange, and movement of the placenta. This can cause reduce growth of the foetus, and may lead to miscarriage.

== Diagnosis ==
MPFD is diagnosed based on histological examination of the chorionic villi of the placenta. Villitis of unknown etiology is distinguished by the occurrence of lymphohistiocytic infiltration in above five villi on several slides. This diagnostic process is difficult, as there is great variety in appearance, and an overlap in signs with maternal floor infarction.

== Prognosis ==
MPFD always causes reduced foetal growth. It causes premature birth in 33% of pregnancies, and neonatal death in 31% of pregnancies.

== Treatment ==
There are currently no widespread treatments for MPFD. There is anecdotal evidence of successful use of pravastatin to reverse MPFD during pregnancy.

== Epidemiology ==
MPFD is very rare. Incidence is estimated to be around 0.028%, or around 1 in 3,500 pregnancies. It may account for 12% of pregnancies where foetal growth is restricted. It shares symptoms with maternal floor infarction. In mothers who have already experienced it, there is a high risk of recurrence. Recurrence may be around 18%, although in cases where miscarriage occur in the first trimester, it may be as high as 50%.
