= Coxsackievirus-induced cardiomyopathy =

- Specialty: Cardiology

Coxsackieviruses-induced cardiomyopathy are positive-stranded RNA viruses in picornavirus family and the genus enterovirus, acute enterovirus infections such as Coxsackievirus B3 have been identified as the cause of virally induced acute myocarditis, resulting in dilated cardiomyopathy. Dilated cardiomyopathy in humans can be caused by multiple factors including hereditary defects in the cytoskeletal protein dystrophin in Duchenne muscular dystrophy (DMD) patients). A heart that undergoes dilated cardiomyopathy shows unique enlargement of ventricles, and thinning of the ventricular wall that may lead to heart failure. In addition to the genetic defects in dystrophin or other cytoskeletal proteins, a subset of dilated cardiomyopathy is linked to enteroviral infection in the heart, especially coxsackievirus B. Enterovirus infections are responsible for about 30% of the cases of acquired dilated cardiomyopathy in humans.

== Cause ==
Coxsackievirus shows a cardiac tropism partly due to the high expression of coxsackievirus and adenovirus receptors (CAR) in cardiomyocytes. Coxsackievirus B genome is approximately 7.4 Kb and translated as a polycistronic polyprotein. Upon translation, the polyprotein is cleaved by two essential viral proteases, 2A and 3C. The viral protease 2A cleaves the proteins in a sequence specific manner. These viral proteases can also act on host proteins exerting negative effects on the residing cell. Enteroviral protease 2A can cleave the cytoskeletal dystrophin protein in cardiomyocytes disrupting the dystrophin glycoprotein (DCG) complex. The cleavage site of dystrophin by protease 2A occurs in the hinge 3 region of the protein resulting a disruption of DCG complex and loss of sarcolemma integrity and increasing myocyte permeability. This eventually results in similar cardiac deformities observed in dilated cardiomyopathy caused by hereditary defects in dystrophin in DMD patients. Additionally, dystrophin deficiency has been shown to increase the severity in dilated cardiomyopathy in a mouse model for DMD. The increased susceptibility of dystrophin deficient heart to coxsackievirus-induced dilated cardiomyopathy is attributed to more efficient release of the virus from infected cells resulting an increase in viral-mediated cytopathic effects.

Viral-induced dilated cardiomyopathy can be characterized using different methods. A 2011 study showed in coxsackievirus infected heart proteome, increased levels of fibrotic extracellular matrix proteins and reduced amounts of energy-producing enzymes can be observed suggesting they could be characteristic in enteroviral cardiomyopathy.

There are notable differences between the hereditary dilated cardiomyopathy in DMD and acute coxsackieviral-mediated cardiomyopathy.

1. The amount of virally infected cardiomyocytes varies in different stages of the disease. In a mouse model, at the acute stage (7 days after infection with coxsackievirus B3) approximately 10% of the myocytes are infected and could affect overall cardiac function. In chronic murine infection, the percentage of infected cardiomyocytes are much lower.
2. Unlike in the DMD, in coxsackievirus induced cardiomyopathy, acute cleavage of dystrophin in cardiomyocytes is unlikely to induce any prompt compensatory mechanism since host cell translation mechanism is defective in the infected cells.

== Signs and symptoms ==
Coxsackie-induced cardiomyopathy is a potential result of virally induced myocarditis. This cardiomyopathy may present with symptoms such as chest pain, fatigue, heart failure, cardiogenic shock, arrhythmias or sudden death. These symptoms are a by-product of sustained cardiac muscle damage.

If Coxsackie-induced cardiomyopathy worsens to heart failure, this may result in systolic dysfunction, with further complications including mitral and tricuspid valve regurgitation and arrhythmias.

== Treatment ==
A wide variety of treatment modalities are currently recommended including Immunosuppressive agents, intravenous immunoglobulins (IVIG), and antiviral agents although the effectiveness of these treatments are not well established and no specific treatment is available.
