= Högel (disambiguation) =

Högel is a municipality in the district of Nordfriesland, in Schleswig-Holstein, Germany.

Högel may also refer to:

- Axel Högel (1884–1970), Swedish stage and film actor
- Niels Högel (born 1976), German serial killer and former nurse
