= National Medical Research Radiological Center =

National Medical Research Radiological Center Национальный медицинский исследовательский центр радиологии

Geography
- Location: Obninsk, Moscow, Russia

Organisation
- Type: Specialist hospital

History
- Founded: 2014

Links
- Website: https://new.nmicr.ru/en/

National Medical Research Radiological Center of the Ministry of Health of the Russian Federation (Russian: ФГБУ «Национальный медицинский исследовательский центр радиологии» (НМИЦ радиологии) Министерства здравоохранения Российской Федерации) is one of the largest oncological and radiological clusters in Russia, the main institution for radiology, a reference center in the field of pathomorphological research, radiation diagnostics and therapy.

== History ==
In 2014, Russia's first scientific medical cluster in the field of oncology, radiology and urology was established as the National Medical Research Radiological Centre of the Ministry of Health of the Russian Federation. The status of the National Centre allowed us to apply all aspects of modern high-tech medical care available in the world. The purpose of the centre is to unite the efforts of scientists and practitioners in the fight against cancer, to create conditions for the introduction of the latest technologies in the field of cancer treatment, to ensure the breakthrough of Russian science and practice in the creation of nuclear medicine.

Since 2020, the Center becomes as the basic organization for the CIS member states in the field of oncology. On the basis of the Center there are two national registers: the Cancer Register and the National Radiation and Epidemiological Register.

The centre has a full range of modern diagnostic and complex and combined treatment methods for oncological diseases.

The Сenter obtain various kinds of modern radiation installations, including gamma- and cyber- knives, the Russian proton therapy complex Prometheus, introduces advanced technologies such as PIPAC, X–ray surgical methods of treatment, brachytherapy, treatment of radiation injuries.

The centre is one of the leaders in the field of nuclear medicine, development of Russian radiopharmaceuticals and introduction of technologies for their use in clinical practice. The use of nuclear medicine technologies in combined and complex treatment provides significant advantages in the treatment of both oncological and non-oncological diseases.

== Structure ==
NMRRC was established in May 2014 as a joint medical centre, bringing together three of Russia's oldest medical research institutions in Moscow and the Kaluga region, which formed its branches:

- P. Hertsen Moscow Oncology Research Center.
- A. Tsyb Medical Radiological Research Center.
- N. Lopatkin Research Institute of Urology and Interventional Radiology.

== Research and development ==
The Center carries out research into cancer treatment, radiopharmaceuticals and advanced techniques for rehabilitation, primarily based on tissue engineering and regenerative medicine approaches.
