= Coxsackievirus =

Virus that causes digestive upset and sometimes heart damage

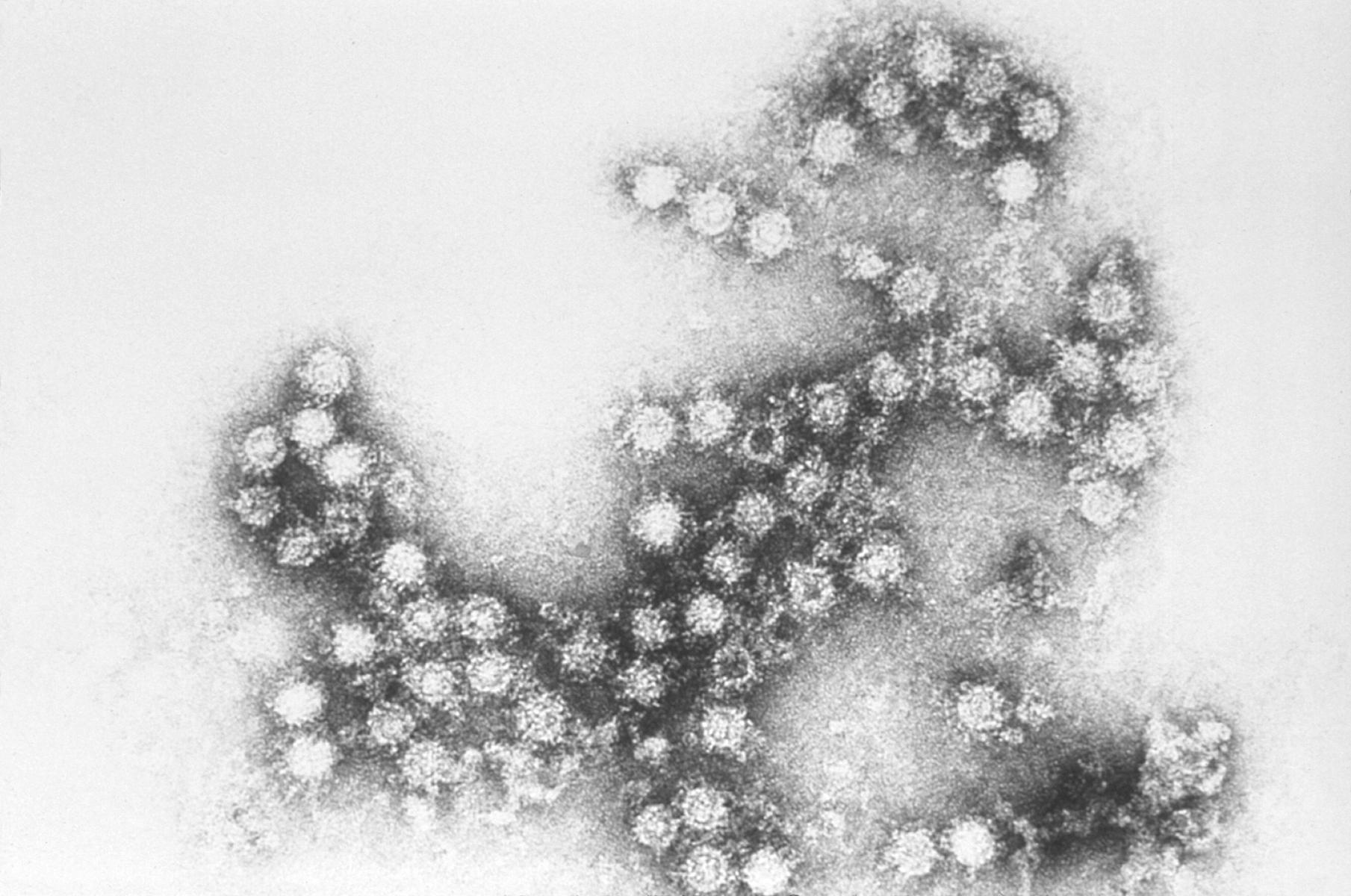
Coxsackie B4 virus particles

Coxsackieviruses are a few related enteroviruses that belong to the Picornaviridae family of nonenveloped, linear, positive-sense, single-stranded, RNA viruses, as well as its genus Enterovirus, which also includes poliovirus and echovirus. Enteroviruses are among the most common and important human pathogens, and ordinarily its members are transmitted by the fecal–oral route. Coxsackieviruses share many characteristics with poliovirus. With control of poliovirus infections in much of the world, more attention has been focused on understanding the nonpolio enteroviruses such as coxsackievirus.

Coxsackieviruses are among the leading causes of aseptic meningitis (the other usual suspected pathogens being echovirus and mumps virus).

The entry of coxsackievirus into cells, especially endothelial cells, is mediated by coxsackievirus and adenovirus receptor.

== Groups ==
Coxsackieviruses are divided into group A and group B viruses based on early observations of their pathogenicity in neonatal mice. Group A coxsackieviruses were noted to cause a flaccid paralysis (which was caused by generalized myositis), while group B coxsackieviruses were noted to cause a spastic paralysis (due to focal muscle injury and degeneration of neuronal tissue). At least 23 serotypes (1–22, 24) of group A and six serotypes (1–6) of group B are recognized.

=== A ===
In general, group A coxsackieviruses tend to infect the skin and mucous membranes, causing herpangina, acute hemorrhagic conjunctivitis, and hand, foot, and mouth disease.

Both group A and group B coxsackieviruses can cause nonspecific febrile illnesses, rashes, upper respiratory tract disease, and aseptic meningitis.

The basic reproduction number (R0) for Coxsackievirus A16 (Cox A16) was estimated to a median of 2.50 with an interquartile range of 1.96 to 3.67.

=== B ===
Group B coxsackieviruses tend to infect the heart, pleura, pancreas, and liver, causing pleurodynia, myocarditis, pericarditis, and hepatitis (inflammation of the liver not related to the hepatotropic viruses). Coxsackie B infection of the heart can lead to pericardial effusion.

The development of insulin-dependent diabetes has recently been associated with recent enteroviral infection, particularly coxsackievirus B pancreatitis. This relationship is currently being studied further.

Sjögren syndrome is also being studied in connection with coxsackievirus, as of January 2010.

== Taxonomy ==
The 29 species of coxsackieviruses, in 1999, had two abolished and the rest merged into other species.

Former name	Current name
Human coxsackievirus A1	Enterovirus C
Human coxsackievirus A2	Enterovirus A
Human coxsackievirus A3	Enterovirus A
Human coxsackievirus A4	abolished
Human coxsackievirus A5	Enterovirus A
Human coxsackievirus A6	abolished
Human coxsackievirus A7	Enterovirus A
Human coxsackievirus A8	Enterovirus A
Human coxsackievirus A9	Enterovirus B
Human coxsackievirus A10	Enterovirus A
Human coxsackievirus A11	Enterovirus C
Human coxsackievirus A12	Enterovirus A
Human coxsackievirus A13	Enterovirus C
Human coxsackievirus A14	Enterovirus A
Human coxsackievirus A15	Enterovirus C
Human coxsackievirus A16	Enterovirus A
Human coxsackievirus A17	Enterovirus C
Human coxsackievirus A18	Enterovirus C
Human coxsackievirus A19	Enterovirus C
Human coxsackievirus A20	Enterovirus C
Human coxsackievirus A21	Enterovirus C
Human coxsackievirus A22	Enterovirus C
Human coxsackievirus A24	Enterovirus C
Human coxsackievirus B1	Enterovirus B
Human coxsackievirus B2	Enterovirus B
Human coxsackievirus B3	Enterovirus B
Human coxsackievirus B4	Enterovirus B
Human coxsackievirus B5	Enterovirus B
Human coxsackievirus B6	Enterovirus B

== History ==
The coxsackieviruses were discovered in 1948–49 by Gilbert Dalldorf, a scientist working at the New York State Department of Health in Albany, New York.

Dalldorf, in collaboration with Grace Sickles, had been searching for a cure for poliomyelitis. Earlier work Dalldorf had done in monkeys suggested that fluid collected from a nonpolio virus preparation could protect against the crippling effects of polio. Using newborn mice as a vehicle, Dalldorf attempted to isolate such protective viruses from the feces of polio patients. In carrying out these experiments, he discovered viruses that often mimicked mild or nonparalytic polio. The virus family he discovered was eventually given the name Coxsackie, from Coxsackie, New York, a small town on the Hudson River where Dalldorf had obtained the first fecal specimens.

Dalldorf also collaborated with Gifford on many early papers.

The coxsackieviruses subsequently were found to cause a variety of infections, including epidemic pleurodynia (Bornholm disease), and were subdivided into groups A and B based on their pathology in newborn mice. (Coxsackie A virus causes paralysis and death of the mice, with extensive skeletal muscle necrosis; Coxsackie B causes less severe infection in the mice, but with damage to more organ systems, such as heart, brain, liver, pancreas, and skeletal muscles.)

The use of suckling mice was not Dalldorf's idea but was brought to his attention in a paper written by Danish scientists Orskov and Andersen in 1947, who were using such mice to study a mouse virus. The discovery of the coxsackieviruses stimulated many virologists to use this system, and ultimately resulted in the isolation of a large number of so-called "enteric" viruses from the gastrointestinal tract that were unrelated to poliovirus, and some of which were oncogenic (cancer-causing).

The discovery of the coxsackieviruses yielded further evidence that viruses can sometimes interfere with each other's growth and replication within a host animal. Other researchers found this interference can be mediated by a substance produced by the host animal, a protein now known as interferon. Interferon has since become prominent in the treatment of a variety of cancers and infectious diseases.

In 2007, an outbreak of coxsackievirus occurred in eastern China. It has been reported that 22 children died. More than 800 people were affected, with 200 children hospitalized.

Cavatak, a wild-type Coxsackievirus A21, is being used in human clinical trials as an oncolytic virus. SCAR-Fc (Soluble Receptor Analogue) is an experimental prophylactic treatment against coxsackievirus B3 (CVB) infections.
