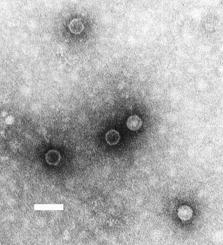
- TEM micrograph of poliovirus virions. Scale bar, 50 nm.

Virus classification
- (unranked): Virus
- Realm: Riboviria
- Kingdom: Orthornavirae
- Phylum: Pisuviricota
- Class: Pisoniviricetes
- Order: Picornavirales
- Family: Picornaviridae
- Genus: Enterovirus
- Species: Enterovirus C

Member virus and serotypes
- EV-C95; EV-C96; EV-C99; EV-C102; EV-C104; EV-C105; EV-C109; EV-C116; EV-C117; EV-C118; Poliovirus; Poliovirus-1; Poliovirus-2; Poliovirus-3

= Enterovirus C =

Species of virus

Enterovirus C is a species of enterovirus. Its best known subtype is poliovirus, the cause of poliomyelitis. There are three serotypes of poliovirus, PV1, PV2, and PV3. Other subtypes of Enterovirus C include EV-C95, EV-C96, EV-C99, EV-C102, EV-C104, EV-C105, EV-C109, EV-C116, EV-C117, and EV-C118. Some non-polio types of Enterovirus C have been associated with the polio-like condition AFP (acute flaccid paralysis), including 2 isolates of EV-C95 from Chad.
