= Echovirus =

Group of viruses

Echovirus is a polyphyletic group of viruses associated with enteric disease in humans. The name is derived from "enteric cytopathic human orphan virus". These viruses were originally not associated with disease, but many have since been identified as disease-causing agents. The term "echovirus" was used in the scientific names of numerous species, but all echoviruses are now recognized as strains of various species, most of which are in the family Picornaviridae.

== List of echoviruses ==
Thirty-four echoviruses are known:

- Human echoviruses 1–7, 9, 11–21, 24–27, and 29–33 are strains of the species Enterovirus B of the genus Enterovirus.
- Human echovirus 8 was shown to be identical to Human echovirus 1 and was abolished as a species.
- Human echovirus 10 was reclassified as a strain of the species Reovirus type 1, currently named Mammalian orthoreovirus of the genus Orthoreovirus, which belongs to the family Reoviridae. As such, Human echovirus 10 is the only echovirus that does not belong to the family Picornaviridae.
- Human echoviruses 22 and 23 are strains of the species Parechovirus A of the genus Parechovirus.
- Human echovirus 28 was reclassified as the species Human rhinovirus 1A, which was later merged with other rhinovirus strains into the currently named species Rhinovirus A of the genus Enterovirus.
- Human echovirus 34 was abolished as a species and reclassified as a strain of Human coxsackievirus A24, which is now classified as a strain of the species Enterovirus C of the genus Enterovirus.

== Symptoms ==
When one is infected with echovirus, symptoms are rare but can occur. When symptoms occur, they often include a cough, rash, and influenza-like symptoms. Rare symptoms include viral meningitis, which affects the brain and spinal cord.

== Treatment ==
Echovirus infection mostly clears up on its own. Doctors may give an immune-system treatment called IVIG, which can help those with weak immune systems. No medicines are known to help against the virus.
