= Viralytics =

Biotechnology company

Viralytics Ltd
- Industry: Biotechnology
- Founded: 2006
- Headquarters: Sydney
- Key people: Paul A. Hopper; Non-Executive chairman); Malcolm McColl (chief executive officer); Darren Shafren (Chief Scientific Officer)
- Products: Cavatak, an oncylytic virus
- Website: www.viralytics.com

Viralytics Ltd is an Australian biotechnology company working in the field of oncolytic viruses, that is, viruses that preferentially infect and kill cancer cells. The company's oncolytic virus product, called Cavatak, is currently in clinical trials in metastatic melanoma and other cancers. The drug was granted Orphan Drug status in advanced melanoma in December 2005.

== Corporate history ==
Around 1999 a team led by the virologist Professor Darren Shafren at the University of Newcastle in Australia established that a Coxsackievirus called Coxsackievirus A21 was an oncolytic virus, in addition to being a common-cold virus causing mild upper respiratory tract infections. Shafren filed for patent protection over the use of the virus in oncology and the University of Newcastle subsequently formed a spin-out company called ViroTarg Pty Ltd. An ASX-listed biotech company called Psiron began to fund development of the ViroTarg project in June 2004 and in December 2006 acquired the Virotarg intellectual property. Psiron changed its name in the process to Viralytics to reflect the fact that oncolytic viruses were now its core focus. Shafren's wild-type Coxsackievirus A21, which Viralytics called Cavatak, was trialled in a Phase I in melanoma between 2007 and 2010 and in 2012 the product entered a Phase II trial in advanced melanoma called 'CALM', short for CAvatak in Late Stage Melanoma'. This trial took place under an Investigational New Drug application. The trial completed in 2015 with favourable results and multiple trials are now underway to establish various indications for Cavatak.

In 2018, Veralytics became a wholly owned subsidiary of Merck & Co.

Viralytics stock is publicly traded on the ASX under the code VLA. In the US its ADRs have traded OTC since October 2006 and on OTCQX under the code VRACY since August 2013. The ratio of ADRs to the ordinary shares is 30:1.

=== Board of directors ===
Viralytics' Non-Executive chairman is Paul Hopper, an Australian bioentrepreneur based in Sydney who has been a director since September 2008 and chairman since November 2008. The company's CEO is Dr Malcolm McColl, a former executive of the major Australian pharmaceutical company CSL and the biotech company Starpharma who joined the company in January 2013.

=== Locations ===
Viralytics' is headquartered in the City Mutual Building, an art deco icon in the Sydney CBD located at 66 Hunter Street. Darren Shafren has a laboratory in Newcastle.

=== Cavatak ===
Cavatak is the trade name for a preparation of wild-type Coxsackievirus A21, as manufactured by Viralytics. Within the Picornaviradae family of viruses, Coxsackievirus A21 is a member of the Human enterovirus C species. The virus consists of a single positive-stranded RNA genome within a capsid of approximately 28 nm in diameter. The virus is known to utilise the viral entry receptor ICAM-1 as its primary entry receptor, with DAF as a co-receptor to infect host cells.

==== Mechanism of action ====
The firm argues that Cavatak has a dual mechanism of action. As well as oncolysis through the preferential targeting of cells that over-express the molecules ICAM-1 and/or DAF compared to normal cells, there is also an immunological involvement in which the infection promotes tumour inflammation, which in turn prompts the patient's immune system to attack the infected cancer cells.

==== Pre-clinical evidence of efficacy ====
Shafren et al. first published data showing that Cavatak could destroy melanoma cells in the journal Clinical Cancer Research in January 2004. A June 2005 paper in the International Journal of Oncology showed that this effect worked as well for melanoma exhibiting a highly vascular phenotype. In April 2007, in a paper in the British Journal of Haematology, the Shafren lab showed that Cavatak could work in multiple myeloma and over the next two years papers in The Prostate (May 2008) and Breast Cancer Research and Treatment (January 2009) suggested similar pre-clinical efficacy in prostate and breast cancer respectively. What these cancers have in common is that they all have high levels of ICAM-1 expression.

==== 2007–2011: Early clinical work ====
In January 2010 Viralytics reported favourable results from a nine patient Phase I trial of Cavatak in Stage IV melanoma patients (ClinicalTrials.gov identifier NCT00438009) where the virus was administered intratumourally. In this trial, which was initiated in May 2007 but was not completed until 2009, all patients were given two Cavatak doses of the same size 48 hours apart into a single cutaneous melanoma lesion. Three patients received a low dose, three a middle dose and three a high dose.

- Five of the nine patients, or 55.6%, experienced transient/stable reductions in injected tumour volume or tumour stabilization. No objective responses were observed, however, two patients displayed stable disease as assessed by RECIST following CT scan evaluation;
- Two of the patients that had enjoyed large reductions in lesion volume registered elevated levels of serum GM-CSF, suggesting that there had been an anti-tumour immune response.

These results were presented at the May 2011 Annual Meeting of the American Society of Clinical Oncology, held that same year at Chicago.

==== 2012–2015: The CALM study ====
The Phase II CALM study (ClinicalTrials.gov identifier NCT01227551) took a considerable period of time for Viralytics to initiate – the pre-IND meeting with the FDA was held in June 2010 and Viralytics lodged its IND in November 2010, however the trial wasn't cleared until June 2011. This meant that the study didn't dose its first patient until after January 2012. However this open-label trial was eventually able to evaluate 57 patients with stage IIIc or stage IV melanoma. Each evaluated patient received 10 intratumoural injections of Cavatak over 18 weeks. The dose level was 3 × 10^{8} TCID_{50} virus with the investigators measuring response rates as well as Progression Free Survival at 6 months, and tracking the immune response of the patient. The trial was one of the first in the world to make use of the new Immune-Related Response Criteria.

- Immune-related Progression Free Survival. CALM's Primary Endpoint, reached in September 2013, was 10 patients from a total of 54 evaluable patients experiencing immune-related Progression Free Survival (irPFS) at six months, that is, their tumour had not 'progressed' (i.e. worsened) as determined by the Immune-Related Response Criteria. In September 2014 Viralytics was able to report a 39% irPFS rate at six months (22 of 57 evaluable patients).
- Survival and Response Rate. In June 2015 final survival data from CALM showed a 73% one-year Overall Survival rate in the CALM patients (43 out of 57 patients). The Overall Response Rate in the study from the final data was 28% (8 complete and 8 partial responses out of 57 patients). The Durable Response Rate, where the response continued more than six months, was 21% (12 out of 57 patients). The investigators also noted activity in non-injected distant lesions including lung and liver metastases.

==== Current clinical trials ====
- CALM Extension Study. This Phase II study (ClinicalTrials.gov identifier NCT01636882) is giving patients from the CALM study who have not experienced an immune-related progression event another nine intra-tumoural Cavatak injections in order to allow biopsies taken from both injected and non-injected melanoma lesions. These biopsies are being examined with a view to better understanding how Cavatak triggers an immune response. Data from 13 evaluated patients in the study, reported in June 2015, has shown tumour-infiltrating lymphocytes and PD-L1 upregulation in the area of the lesions, the latter phenomenon suggesting that Cavatak may be synergistic with checkpoint inhibitors.
- STORM (Systemic Treatment Of Resistant Metastatic Disease). This Phase I study (ClinicalTrials.gov identifier NCT02043665), which commenced in March 2014, is recruiting patients with treatment-resistant Non-Small Cell Lung Cancer, castration-resistant prostate cancer, and treatment-resistant melanoma and bladder cancer to receive intravenous injections of Cavatak. Under a November 2015 agreement with Merck & Co. the lung and bladder cancer patients will receive Cavatak in conjunction with the checkpoint inhibitor drug Keytruda.
- CANON CAvatak in NON-Muscle Invasive Bladder Cancer.) This Phase I study (ClinicalTrials.gov identifier NCT02316171), which commenced in the UK in January 2014, is evaluating Cavatak in superficial bladder cancer. This two-part, open label dose escalation study will evaluate the safety and optimal dose of Cavatak as a monotherapy and in combination with the standard of care drug mitomycin C.
- MITCI (Melanoma Intra-Tumoural Cavatak and Ipilimumab). This Phase I study (ClinicalTrials.gov identifier NCT02307149), initiated in December 2014, will see intra-tumoural Cavatak combined with the Bristol-Myers Squibb drug Yervoy, another checkpoint inhibitor, in metastatic melanoma.
- CAPRA (CAvatak and PembRolizumab in Advanced Melanoma). This Phase I study (ClinicalTrials.gov identifier NCT02565992), which initiated in September 2015, will see intra-tumoural Cavatak combined with Keytruda in metastatic melanoma.

== See also ==
- Virotherapy
- Oncolytic virus
