= IRRC =

IRRC may stand for:

- Independent Regulatory Review Commission
- International Road Racing Championship
- Irrigated Rice Research Consortium
- immune-related Response Criteria
