= Imugene =

Australian biotechnology company

Imugene Ltd
- Type: Public company
- Traded as: ASX: IMU
- Industry: Biotechnology
- Founded: 2012
- Headquarters: Melbourne, Australia
- Key people: Paul A. Hopper (Executive chairman); Leslie Chong (Chief Executive Officer); Ursula Wiedermann (Chief Scientific Officer); Axel Hoos (non-executive director); Christoph Zielinski (Scientific Advisory Board member)
- Products: HER-Vaxx
- Website: www.imugene.com

Imugene Ltd is a biotechnology company working in cancer immunotherapy. The company's lead product is HER-Vaxx, a therapeutic cancer vaccine for the treatment of gastric cancer and breast cancer, where the cancer is HER-2-positive. Imugene was planning a Phase Ib/II clinical study of HER-Vaxx in gastric cancer which it intended to initiate in 2016. Imugene stock is publicly traded on the Australian Securities Exchange (ASX).

== History ==
Imugene began as a research project in the laboratory of Professor Ursula Wiedermann at the Medical University of Vienna. Over the nine years from 2004 Wiedermann et al. had developed a B cell peptide cancer immunotherapy that could induce an antibody response targeting HER-2 overexpressing tumours. In 2012 a start-up company called Biolife Science had been incorporated to develop this immunotherapy. Early-stage funding was secured from Australian and US investors in 2013, after which Biolife was taken public in December 2013 in a reverse takeover of an Australian drug development company called Imugene, whose name was retained after the merger. Around US$8m was spent on the HER-Vaxx programme prior to its becoming the 'new Imugene'.

== HER-Vaxx ==
HER-Vaxx has been designed as a more effective alternative to the HER-2-targeting monoclonal antibody drugs Herceptin and Perjeta. In creating HER-Vaxx, Ursula Wiedermann and her colleagues at Medical University of Vienna took the three most immunogenic B cell epitopes from the extracellular domain of HER-2 molecule – called the P4, P6 and P7 antigens – and out of it constructed a peptide vaccine. P6 and P7 sit at the Herceptin binding site while P4 sits at the Perjeta site. The vaccine had been intended to be delivered in 'virosomes', that is, influenza virus particles stripped of their disease-causing contents so as to be able to carry peptides instead. However, in 2015 Imugene announced that it would deliver the vaccine with the diphtheria toxoid CRM197. The vaccine's developers argue that HER-Vaxx has a number of benefits over the anti-HER2 monoclonal antibodies. The vaccine generates a 'polyclonal' rather than a monoclonal antibody response to HER-2 – i.e. different kinds of antibodies – increasing the chance that cells carrying HER-2 will be killed, particularly those at an earlier stage of disease. The delivery system helps adjuvant the vaccine, increasing the size of the immune response. Thirdly, polyclonal antibodies do not appear to have the cardiotoxicity that has been observed in >10% of patients on Herceptin. The potential for immune memory may mean that the treatment effect is long-lasting (by contrast antibodies have a short half-life – that of Herceptin is only 12 days – meaning that the patient has to have infusions every 1–3 weeks). The vaccine would be available intra-muscularly, where Herceptin and Perjeta have to be given by regular infusions.

== HER-Vaxx development history ==
Following on from favourable pre-clinical data, Wiedermann et al. ran a ten-patient safety study of HER-Vaxx in ten patients with Stage IV metastatic breast cancer, albeit with low HER-2 expression. This study found the vaccine to be safe, with no observed cardiotoxicity. The patients developed anti-HER-2 antibodies and in vitro, those anti-HER-2 antibodies showed potent anti-tumour activity. Also in vitro, blood from the patients carried markers of a cellular immune response such as IL-2, IFN-γ and TNF-α (meaning that ultimately patients could be expected to develop T cells to kill the cancer cells, and not just antibodies). The vaccine took down the 'T reg' cell count in the patients, potentially indicating an overcoming of the cancer's immunoresistance.

Imugene was granted a patent for HER-Vaxx in Japan on the 22 September 2021.

== Planned clinical studies of HER-Vaxx ==
Imugene has indicated that it intends to run a Phase Ib/II trial in gastric cancer in 2017, in combination with chemotherapy. The Phase Ib segment of the study would recruit around 15 patients and establish the recommended Phase II dose. The Phase II segment, a randomised but open label study, would recruit around 68 patients and test for Progression-Free and Overall Survival.

== Imugene stock ==
Imugene began as Vos Industries, developer of a new technology for frying food. This company, which made its initial public offering on the ASX in late 1993, was unsuccessful in commercialising the technology. The public company shell was then used from 2002 to list an animal vaccine technology venture, at which time the company took the name Imugene, short for 'Immune Genetics'. This venture was also unsuccessful. In mid-2012 the company was again restructured, this time to develop a drug delivery technology, however this venture was abandoned at the time of the Biolife Science merger, which was announced on 23 October 2013.

== Main people ==
Imugene's executive chairman is Paul Hopper, an Australian bioentrepreneur based in Sydney who was instrumental in identifying the HER-Vaxx project and taking it public in Imugene. The company's chief operating officer is Leslie Chong, who used to be a Senior Clinical Program Lead at Genentech in San Francisco. Ursula Wiedermann remains involved as Chief Scientific Officer and Scientific Advisory Board member.

The Imugene board includes Axel Hoos, who as the medical lead in immunology/oncology at Bristol-Myers Squibb developed the melanoma drug Yervoy.

Alongsiode Ursula Wiedermann, Imugene's Scientific Advisory Board is made up of two medical oncologists – Professor Christoph Zielinski of Medical University of Vienna, and Dr Neil Segal of Memorial Sloan Kettering Cancer Center, whose specialty is gastrointestinal cancers.

== Locations ==
Imugene's corporate headquarters are located in Melbourne however Paul Hopper and Leslie Chong live in Sydney. Imugene's scientific team is located in Vienna.
