= Philippine Rice Research Institute =

Philippine government corporation

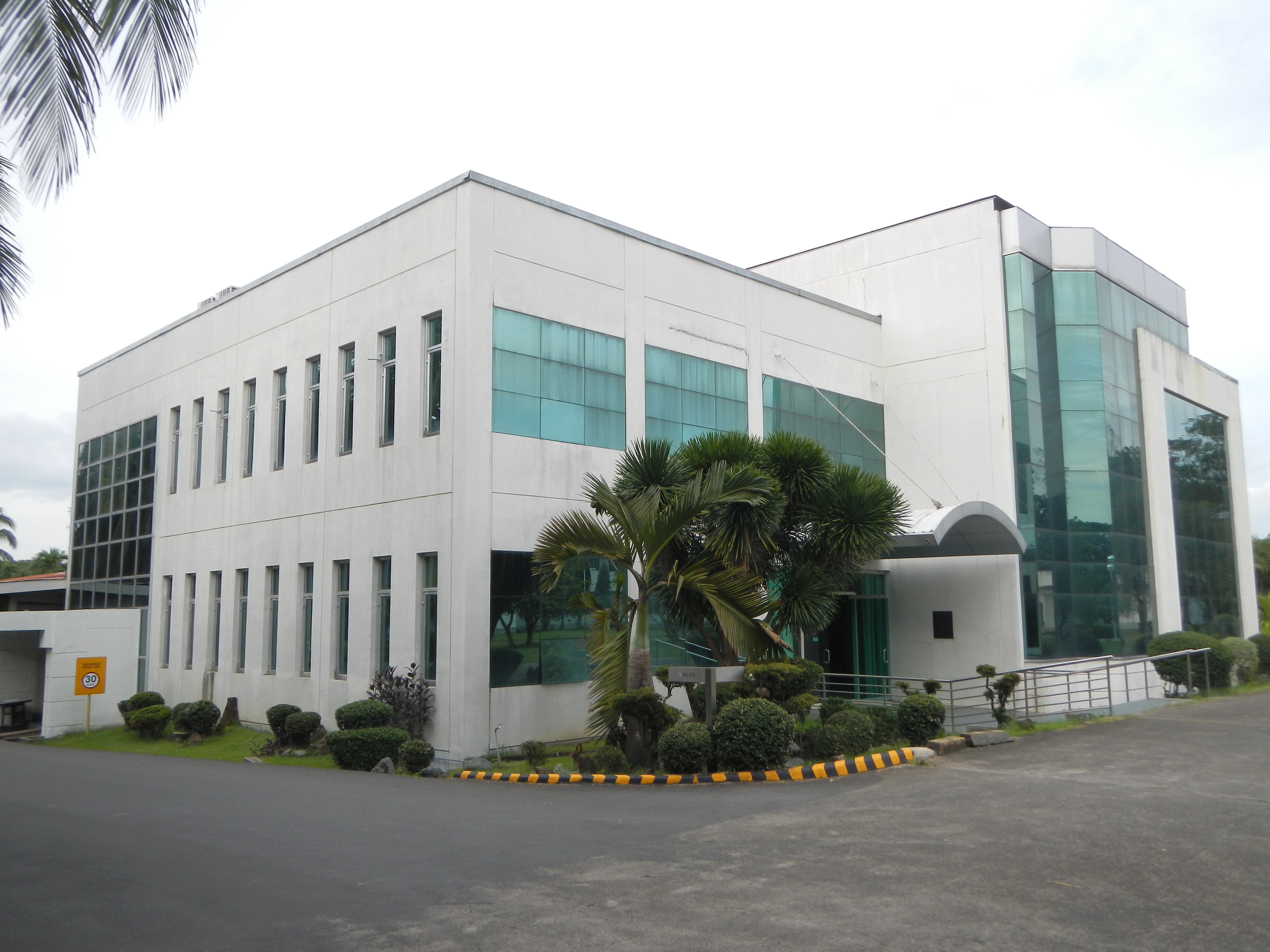
- PhilRice main office building in Muñoz, Nueva Ecija

Agency overview
- Formed: May 11, 1985
- Type: Research institute and Government corporation
- Jurisdiction: Government of the Philippines
- Headquarters: Maligaya, Muñoz, Nueva Ecija, Philippines; 15.672597°N 120.889393°E
- Annual budget: ₱621.8 million Php (2021)
- Agency executive: John Calilan de Leon, Executive Director
- Parent department: Department of Agriculture
- Website: philrice.gov.ph

The Philippine Rice Research Institute (PhilRice; Filipino: Surian ng Pilipinas sa Pananaliksik ng Palay) is a government corporate entity attached to the Department of Agriculture created through Executive Order 1061 on November 5, 1985 (as amended) to help develop high-yielding and cost-reducing technologies for farmers.

The Institute accomplishes this mission through research and development work in our central and six branch stations, coordinating with a network that comprises 57 agencies and 70 seed centers located nationwide.

== History ==
Edgardo Angara convened a committee to brainstorm the idea of establishing a national rice research center. The committee was composed of Domingo M. Lantican, vice chancellor for administration of UP Los Baños; Ricardo M. Lantican, UPLB director for research; Domingo F. Panganiban, deputy minister of Agriculture and Food; Ramon Valmayor, executive director of the Philippine Council for Agriculture, Forestry, and Natural Resources Research and Development; Monkombu Sambasivan Swaminathan, IRRI director general; and Manuel de Leon, staff director of the National Economic and Development Authority.

The proposal for the establishment of PhilRice was submitted to then Pres. Ferdinand E. Marcos through then Agriculture and Food Minister Salvador H. Escudero III. The Executive Order (EO1061) creating PhilRice was signed by President Marcos on November 5, 1985. Then Pres. Corazon C. Aquino signed EO 60 on November 7, 1986, which affirmed the creation and increased membership in the board of trustees of PhilRice. Minister of Agriculture Ramon V. Mitra and UP System President Edgardo J. Angara identified and recommended the members of PhilRice Board of Trustees (BOT) for appointment by President Aquino.

While a director has not yet been appointed, an executing committee chaired by UPLB College of Agriculture Dean Ruben L. Villareal laid the groundwork for PhilRice's program plan and operations. In June 1987, PhilRice operations went full swing with the assumption to office of its first executive director, Dr. Santiago R. Obien. Before his appointment, Obien was president of the Mariano Marcos State University and director of the Philippine Tobacco Research and Training Center. With Dr. Obien at the helm, the executing committee was dissolved and a PhilRice-UPLB Management Committee was created to select UPLB staff members to be seconded to PhilRice as program leaders. The committee's functions were gradually reduced as PhilRice was being organized.

PhilRice's headquarters, originally located at UPLB Campus, could not meet the envisioned manpower and program expansion. Thus, upon the suggestion of Prof. Kenzo Hemmi, IRRI BOT chair, PhilRice sought infrastructure and technical assistance from the Government of Japan through the Japan International Cooperation Agency (JICA). Ramon V. Mitra, Carlos G. Dominguez, and Senen C. Bacani, secretaries of agriculture, strongly supported the idea. Through board resolution in March 1990, the Maligaya Rice Research and Training Center (MRRTC) in Muñoz, Nueva Ecija, which was previously merged with PhilRice, officially became the Central Experiment Station.

== Recent ==
On September 28, 2005, the Bill and Melinda Gates Foundation gave PhilRice a US$ 800,000 grant for biotechnology research into rice with higher beta-carotene, vitamin E, iron, and protein amounts to aiding micronutrient deficiency in Third World countries like the Philippines. Dr. Rhodora R. Aldemita and the University of Freiburg which heads the Gates Foundation's Grand Challenges in Global Health Program, has matched the Gates Foundation's grant with funding into PhilRice's biotech laboratories, a radioisotope laboratory, and screenhouses for testing the modified rice.

On December 4, 2006, the Philippine Rice Research Institute was certified by Technischer Überwachungsverein as an Integrated Management Systems (IMS) compliant organization covering ISO 14001 series 2004 for Environmental Management; ISO 9001 series 2008 for Quality Management; and OHSAS 18001 series 2007 for Occupational Health and Safety Assessment.

In February 2013, the research institute was awarded with US$ 100,000 from the Arab Gulf Programme for Development, a non-profit development organization based in Riyadh, Saudi Arabia. The institute was awarded for its program that helps farmers and agriculture professionals in providing them information in an open academy. The project also provides assistance through mobile messaging, thereby allowing the institute to reach more farmers in the country.

In 2025, PhilRice announced its discovery of three new rice varieties NSIC Rc 472, PSB Rc 10, and Rc 514 with low glycemic index which promise effective the diabetics' blood sugar regulation.

== Organization ==
Executive Directors of PhilRice
Name	Tenure of office
Santiago R. Obien	1987–2000
Leocadio S. Sebastian	2000–2008
Ronilo A. Beronio	2008–2011
Eufemio T. Rasco Jr.	2011–2015
Calixto M. Protacio	2015–2016
Sailila E. Abdula	2016–2019
John C. de Leon	2019–present

The board of trustees is composed of twelve members representing all sectors and stakeholders of the rice industry. The membership to the board is done through the appointments of the President of the Philippines. Currently, the board is composed of Agriculture Secretary Pres. Bongbong Marcos, who also sits as the ex-officio chairperson; Senen C. Bacani, representing the agribusiness community; Dr. Gelia T. Castillo and CMU President Dr. Maria Luisa R. Soliven, both representing the science community; Herculano C. Co Jr. of grains business sector; Winston C. Corvera of the farming sector; Thelma G. Domingo and Edicia G. Della Torre, both from the consumer sector; Jose S. Concepcion Jr. of the business community; and Dr. Teodoro C. Mendoza of the academic community. Dr. Castillo has been a member of the board of trustees since it was first formed.

== Programs ==
The Philippine Rice Research Institute has numerous interdisciplinary programs which develops and promotes technologies that are ecosystem-based, location- and problem-specific, and profitable to the Filipino farmers. Currently, it has two major programs: Rice Business Innovation System (RiceBIS) and Strategically Modernized and Robust Technologies for Competitive and Secure Rice Industry (SMARTerRice).

The Research Institute also carried the seven R&D program structure from 1987 to 1998. These were Rice Varietal Improvement, Planting and Fertilizer Management, Integrated Pest Management, Rice-based Farming Systems, Rice Engineering and mechanization, Rice Chemistry and Food Science, and Social Science and Policy Research. A change to its R&D structure was implemented from 1998 to 2005. Each multidisciplinary R&D program was carried by the different discipline-based divisions and each division participated in each R&D programs, as follows: Policy Research and Advocacy, Technology Promotion, Rice and Rice-based Products, Rice-Based Farming systems for Fragile Environment, Hybrid Rice, Transplanted Irrigated Lowland Rice, Direct Seeded Irrigated Lowland Rice, and Environmental Sustainability & Management.

== National ==
PhilRice partners with local research institutions such as DOST-PCARRD and the DA-BAR in planning, monitoring, and reviewing R&D activities.

PhilRice also coordinates the National Rice R&D Network (NRRDN), a formal and functional structure of 57 strategically located agencies, working toward a common goal of sustained self-sufficiency in rice. Two of these are designated as national research centers, six as branch stations representing the country's major rice-growing zones, 14 as regional research centers, as 35 as cooperating stations. Within the network are groups that address specific R&D areas such as the rice varietal improvement, technology promotion, rice mechanization, and SeedNet.

National Research Centers

   Department of Agriculture
   Regional Field Units
   Regional Integrated Agricultural Research Centers
   Seed Farms/Outreach Stations
   Bureau of Agricultural Research
   Bureau of Agricultural Statistics
   Agricultural Training Institute
   Bureau of Soils and Water Management
   Bureau of Plant Industry
   BPI-National Seed Quality Control Services
   National Agricultural and Fishery Council
   National Irrigation Administration
   National Food Authority
   Philippine Center for Postharvest Development and Mechanization
   Philippine Crop Insurance Corporation
   Department of Science and Technology (DOST)
   Advance Science Technology Institute (ASTI)
   Food and Nutrition Research Institute (FNRI)
   Philippine Council for Agriculture, Aquatic and Natural Resources Research and Development (PCAARRD)
   Department of Education (DepED)
   Department of Environment and Natural Resources (DENR)
   Department of Agrarian Reform (DAR)
   Development Academy of the Philippines (DAP)
   Philippine Atmospheric, Geophysical and Astronomical Services Administration (PAGASA)
   Provincial and Municipal Local Government Units
   State Colleges and Universities (SCUs)

Non-Government/Private Organizations

   Agricultural Cooperative Development International/Volunteers in Overseas Cooperative Assistance
   Alliance of Philippine Partners in Enterprise Development
   Alalay sa Kaunlaran, Incorporated
   Advanta Incorporated
   Asia Rice Foundation
   Bayer Crop Science Philippines
   Beidahuang Seed Group
   DevGen Philippines
   Pioneer Hi-bred Phils, Inc
   Philippine Foundation of Rural Broadcasters
   Seedworks India Pvt. Ltd.
   SL Agritech Corporation
   Tulay sa Pag-unlad Incorporated
   Philippine Insurers and Reinsurers Association

National Rice R&D Networks

National Research Centers

   PhilRice Central Experiment Station, Maligaya, Science City of Muñoz, Nueva Ecija
   University of the Philippines, Los Baños, Laguna

Branch Stations

   PhilRice Batac, MMSU Campus, Batac City, 2906 Ilocos Norte
   PhilRice Isabela, San Mateo, 3318 Isabela
   PhilRice Los Baños, UPLB Campus, college, 4031 Laguna
   PhilRice Bicol, Batang, Ligao City, 4505 Albay
   PhilRice Negros, Cansilayan, Murcia, 6129 Negros Occidental
   PhilRice Agusan, Basilisa, RTRomualdez, 8611 Agusan del Norte
   PhilRice Midsayap, Bual Norte, Midsayap, 9410 North Cotabato

Regional Research Centers

   DA-Cordillera Integrated Agricultural Research Center (CIARC), Rizal, Kalinga
   DA-Ilocos Integrated Agricultural Research Center(ILIARC), Bacnotan, 2515 La Union
   DA-Cagayan Valley Integrated Agricultural Research Center (CVIARC), Ilagan, 3300 Isabela
   DA-Central Luzon Integrated Agricultural Research Center (CLIARC), Magalang, 2011 Pampanga
   DA-Bicol Integrated Agricultural Research Center (BIARC), Pili, 4418 Camarines Sur
   DA-Western Visayas Integrated Agricultural Research Center (WESVIARC), Jaro, 5000 Iloilo City
   DA-Central Visayas Integrated Agricultural Research Center (CENVIARC), M. Velez St., 6000 Cebu City
   DA-Eastern Visayas Integrated Agricultural Research Center (EVIARC), Babatngon, Leyte
   DA-Western Mindanao Integrated Agricultural Research Center (WESMIARC), Ipil, 7001 Zamboanga Sibugay
   DA-Northern Mindanao Integrated Agricultural Research Center (NOMIARC), Malaybalay City 8719 Bukidnon
   DA-Southern Mindanao Integrated Agricultural Research Center (SMIARC), Bago Oshiro, 8000 Davao City
   DA-Central Mindanao Integrated Agricultural Research Center (CEMIARC), Kidapawan City, 9400 North Cotabato
   Department of Agriculture and Fisheries -Autonomous Region in Muslim Mindanao Integrated Agricultural Research Center (DAF-ARMMIARC), ORG Compound, 9600 Cotabato City
   DA-Caraga Integrated Agricultural Research Center (CARIARC), Trento, 8505 Agusan del Sur

Cooperating Stations

   Abra State Institute of Science and Technology (ASIST), Lagangilang, 2802 Abra
   Benguet State University (BSU), La Trinidad, 2601 Benguet
   Mariano Marcos State University (MMSU), Batac City, 2906 Ilocos Norte
   Ilocos Sur Polytechnic State College (ISPSC), Sta. Maria, 2705 Ilocos Sur
   Don Mariano Marcos Memorial State University (DMMMSU), Bacnotan, 2515 La Union
   Pangasinan State University (PSU), Sta. Maria, 2440 Pangasinan
   Isabela State University (ISU), Echague, 3309 Isabela
   Quirino State College (QSC), Diffun, 3401 Quirino
   Nueva Vizcaya State University (NVSU), Bayombong, 3700 Nueva Vizcaya
   Central Luzon State University (CLSU), Science City of Muñoz, 3120 Nueva Ecija
   Pampanga Agricultural College, Magalang 2011 Pampanga
   Ramon Magsaysay Technological University, Iba, 2201 Zambales
   Bulacan Agricultural State College, San Ildefonso, 3010 Bulacan
   Tarlac College of Agriculture, Camiling, 2306 Tarlac
   Dr. Emilio B. Espinosa Sr. Memorial State College of Agriculture and Technology, Mandaon, 5411 Masbate
   Aklan State University, Banga, 5601 Aklan
   Capiz State University, Mambusao, 5807 Capiz
   Central Philippine University, Jaro, 5000 Iloilo City
   Eastern Samar State University, Borongan, 6800 Eastern Samar
   Visayas State University, Baybay, 6521 Leyte
   Central Mindanao University, Musuan 8710 Bukidnon
   Misamis Oriental State College of Agriculture and Technology, Claveria, 9004 Misamis Oriental
   Mindanao State University, Marawi City, 9700 Lanao del Sur
   University of Southern Mindanao, Kabacan, 9407 North Cotabato
   DA-CAR-Research Outreach Station, Luna, 3813 Apayao
   DA-Cagayan Valley Lowland and Marine-Research Outreach Station, Iguig, 3504 Cagayan
   DA-Central Luzon Integrated Agricultural Research Center-Lowland, San Manuel, 3011 Tarlac
   DA-Experimental Farm for Crops, Naujan, 5204 Oriental Mindoro
   DA-Bicol Experiment Station, Pili, 4418 Camarines Sur
   DA-BPI-La Granja National Crops Research & Development Center, La Carlota City, 6310 Negros Occidental
   DA-Central Visayas Integrated Agricultural Research Center-Soil Water Research and Demonstration Station, Calanggaman, Ubay, 6315 Bohol
   DA-Central Visayas Integrated Agricultural Research Center-Bohol Experiment Station, Gabi, Ubay, 6315 Bohol
   DA-Central Visayas Integrated Agricultural Research Center-Agricultural Promotion Center, Dao, 6300 Tagbilaran City
   DA-Eastern Visayas Integrated Agricultural Research Center-Research Outreach Station for Lowland Development, Abuyog, 6510 Leyte
   DA-Eastern Visayas Integrated Agricultural Research Center-Research Outreach Station for Lowland Development, Catubig, 6418 Northern Samar
   Eastern Visayas Integrated Agricultural Research Center for Postharvest Technology Development, San Jorge, 6707 Western Samar
   DA-Western Mindanao Integrated Agricultural Research Center-Research Outreach Station, San Miguel, 7029 Zamboanga del Sur
   DA-Bukidnon Agricultural Productivity Center, Dangcagan, Bukidnon
   DA-CEMIARC for Upland and Lowland Development, Tupi, 9505 South Cotabato
   DA-Central Mindanao Integrated Agricultural Research Center-Research Outreach Station, Tacurong City, 9800 Sultan Kudarat
   DA-Northern Mindanao Integrated Agricultural Research Center-Research Outreach Station, Talacogon, 8510 Agusan Sur

Farmer Partners

   Kalinga Hybrid Rice Seed Growers Multi- Purpose Cooperative, Tabuk, 3800 Kalinga
   Tabuk Hybrid Rice Seed Growers Multi- Purpose Cooperative Inc., Tabuk, 3800 Kalinga
   Isabela Seed Growers Multi-Purpose Cooperative, Inc., Cauayan City, 3305 Isabela
   Nueva Ecija Seed Growers Association, Maligaya, Science City of Muñoz, 3119 Nueva Ecija
   lloilo Integrated Seed Growers' Multi-Purpose Cooperative, La Paz, 5000 Iloilo City
   Pototan Seed Growers' Multi-Purpose Cooperative, Pototan, 5008 Iloilo
   Negros Occidental Accredited Seed Producers Cooperative, Bacolod City 6100 Negros Occidental
   Southern Leyte Seed Growers' Association, St. Bernard, 6616 Southern Leyte
   Davao Multi-Purpose Seed Producers' Cooperative, Inc., Tagum City, 8100 Davao del Norte
   Davao del Sur Seed Producers' Cooperative, Inc., Digos City, 8002 Davao del Sur
   Davao Oriental Seed Producers' Cooperative, Banaybanay, 8208 Davao Oriental
   Seed to Rice Producers Cooperative, Lupon, Davao Oriental
   South Cotabato Seed Producers' Cooperative, Koronadal City 9506 South Cotabato
   Binhian ng Timug Kutabato Multi-Purpose Cooperative, Surallah 9512 South Cotabato

== International ==
PhilRice conducts joint RD&E activities with international donor agencies such as the following:

   Asia Rice Foundation
   Bill and Melinda Gates Foundation
   Enertime SAS, France
   German Development Cooperation
   International Atomic Energy Agency
   International Rice Research Institute
   International Crops Research Institute for the Semi-Arid Tropics
   Japan International Cooperation Agency
   Helmholtz Center for Environmental Research, Germany
   Nagoya University, Japan
   Rural Development Administration, Republic of Korea
   RDA- Korean Project on International Agriculture
   Korea International Cooperation Agency
   Sarmap S.A., Switzerland
   Southeast Asian Regional Center for Graduate Study and Research in Agriculture

== Externally funded projects ==
PhilRice implements a number of R&D projects funded by foreign donors, such as the following:

- Bill and Melinda Gates Foundation for Golden Rice Development
- JICA
- GTZ
- EC-FAO
- Korea RDA
- DOST-PCARRD
- Office of Senator Edgardo J. Angara (OSEJA)

The institute also implements the "Rolling Out Techno Gabay Rice Program for Sufficient Food on the Table. Sub-Program 3: S&T-Based Farms (STBF) on Rice Production in Selected Irrigated and Rainfed Areas" and "STBF on Increasing Yield through Utilization of Quality Rice Seeds of Recommended Varieties" in partnership with Philippine Council for Agriculture, Forestry and Natural Resources Research and Development, local government units, and Magsasakang Siyentista.

== Gallery ==
Philippine Rice Research Institute
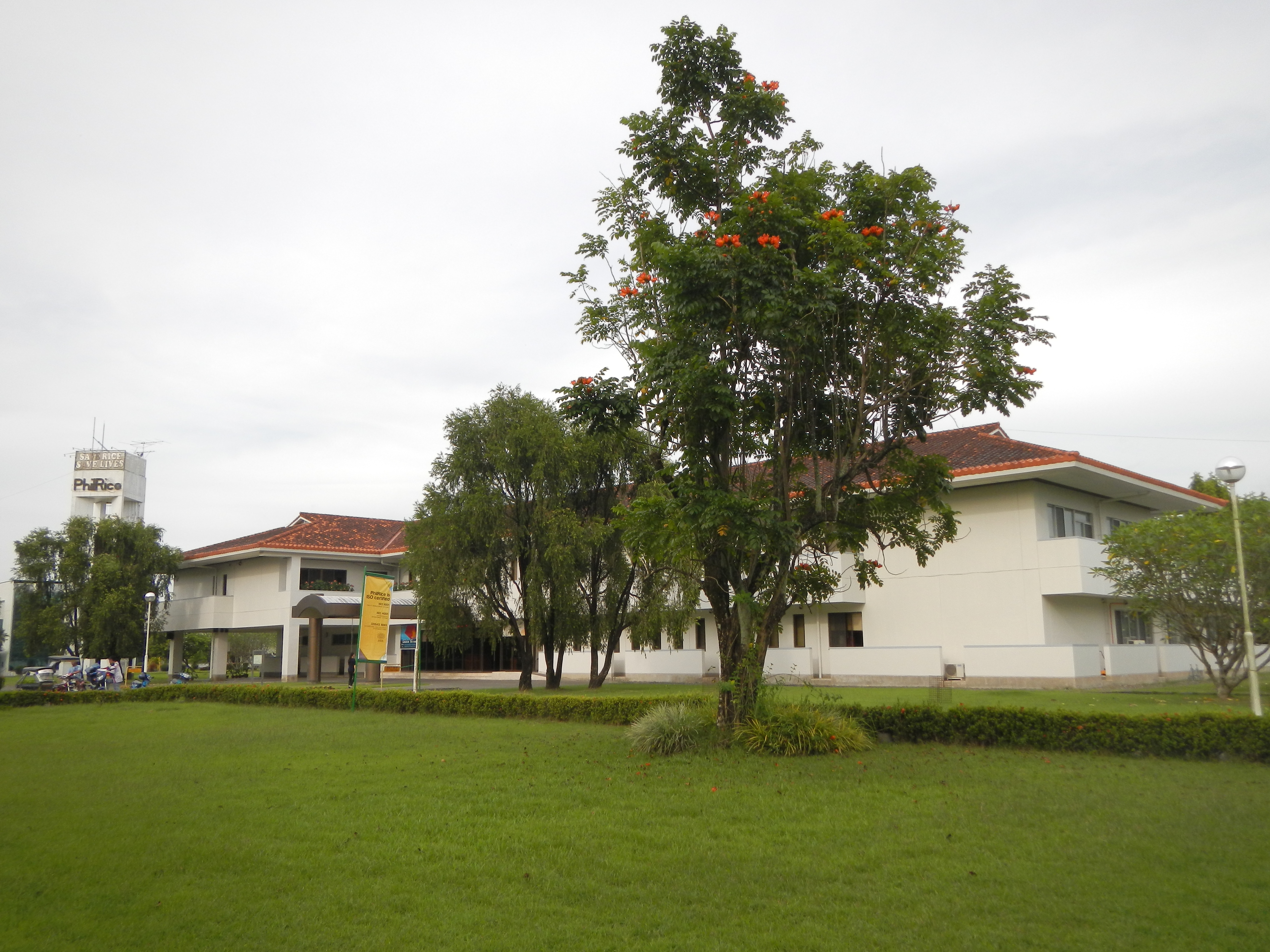
The facade of the PhilRice Muñoz, Nueva Ecija.

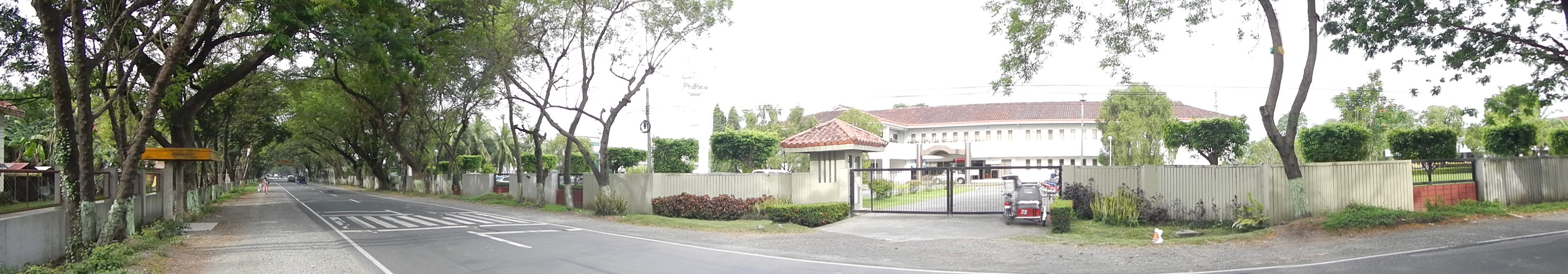
A panoramic view of the headquarters complex from the highway.

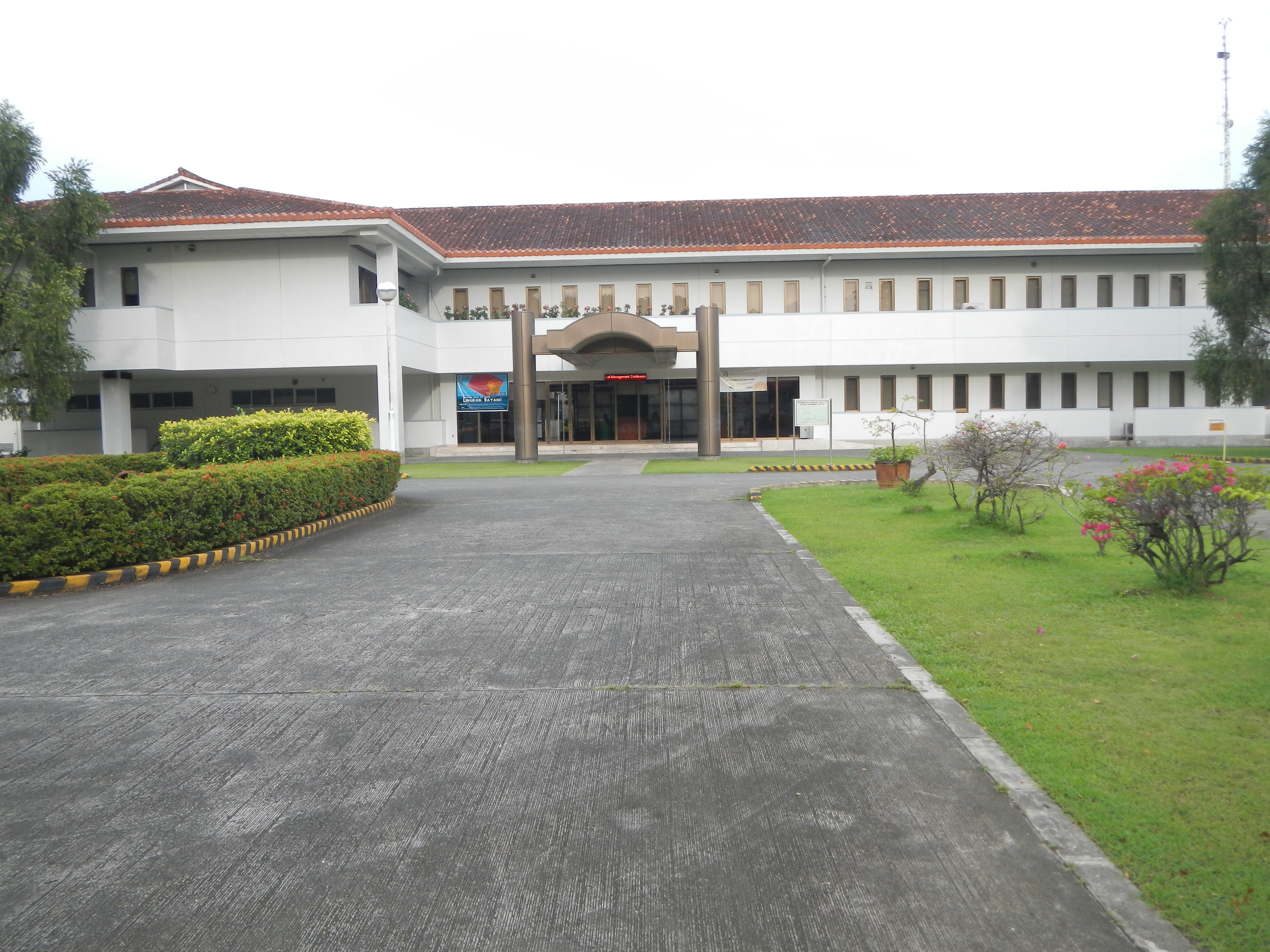
The PhilRice Central Experiment Station.

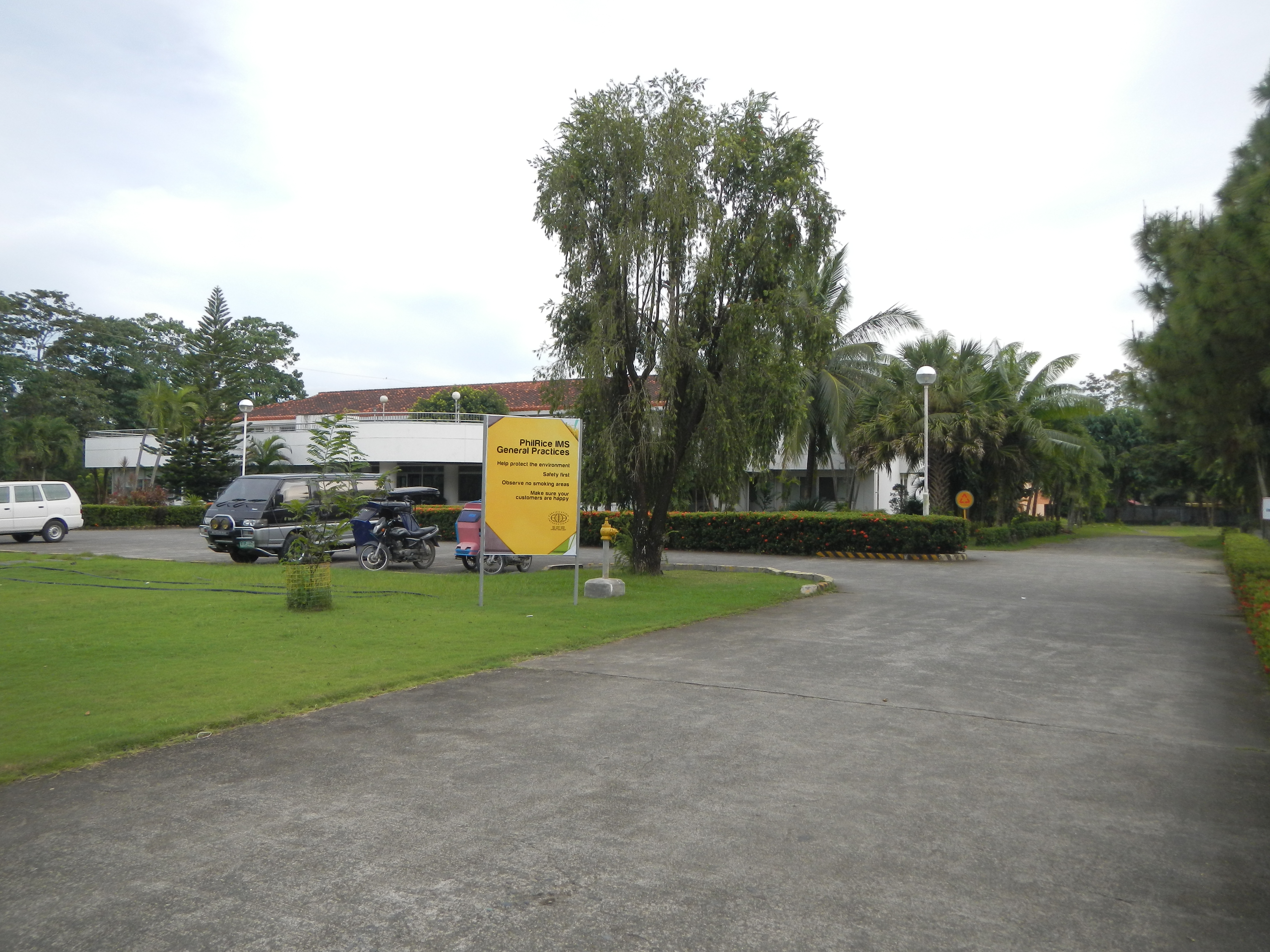
The PhilRice Training Center.

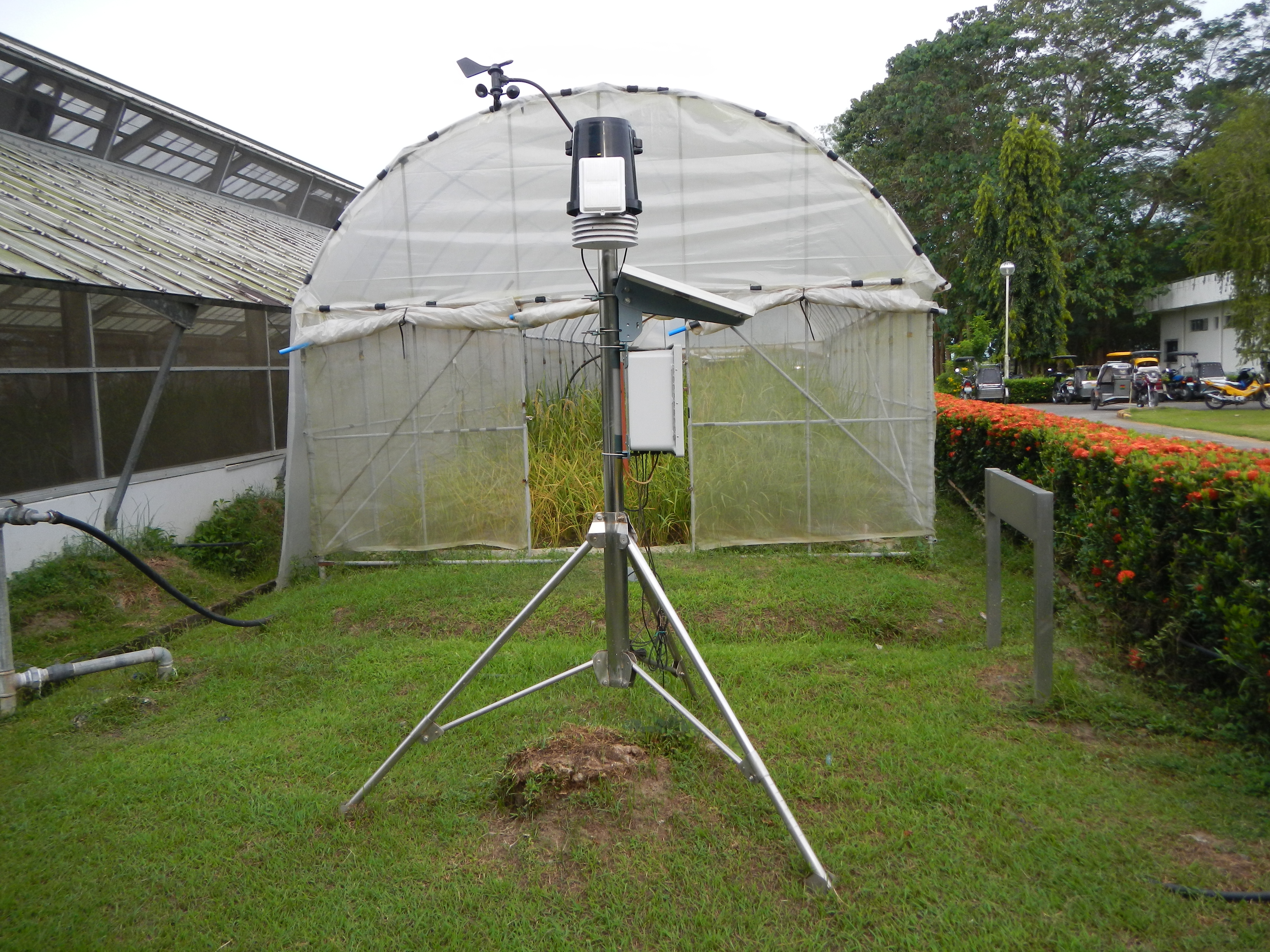
Solar power instrument for drough soil experiment used in PhilRice.

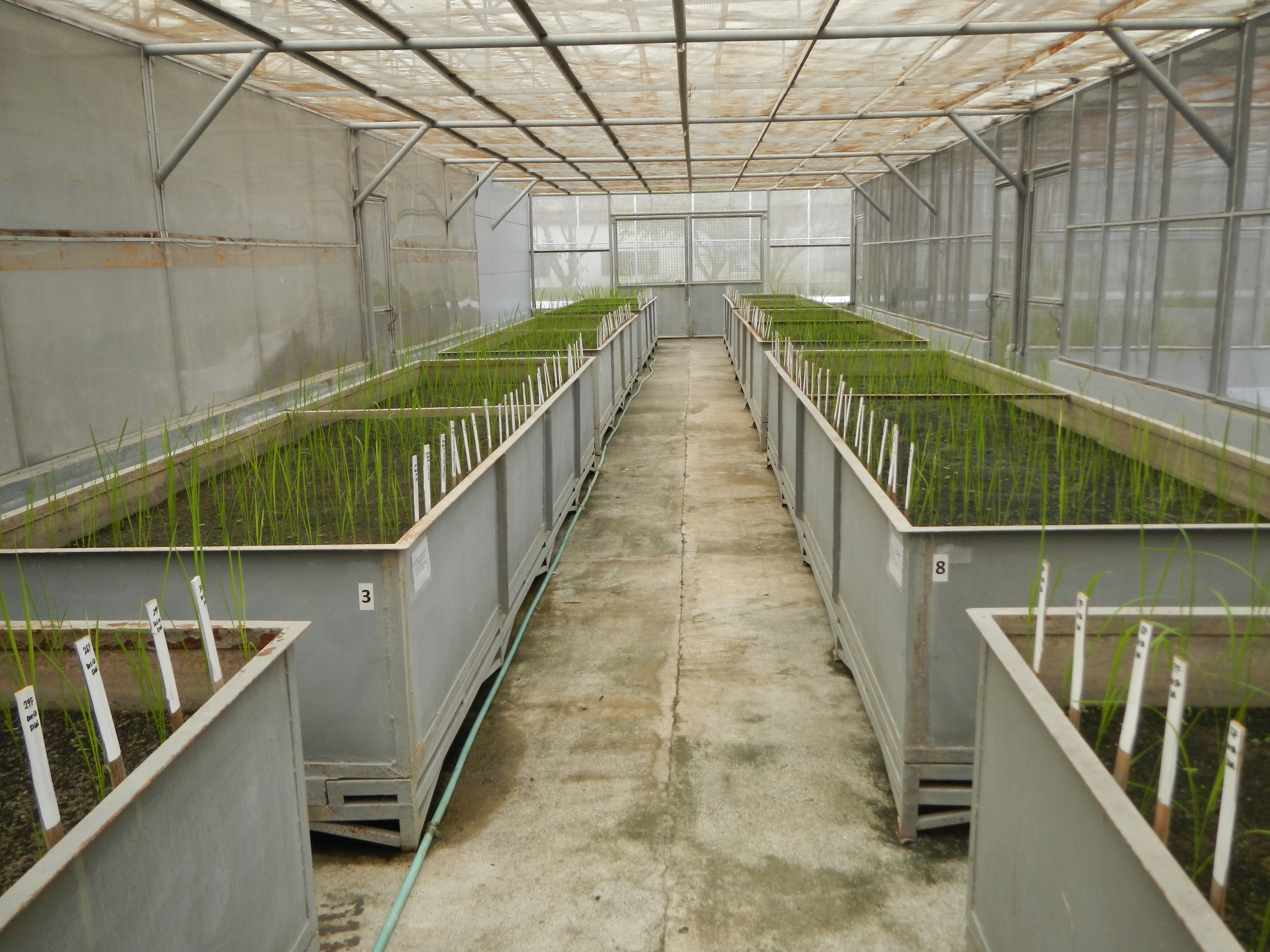
Controlled experiments of rice varieties at PhilRice.

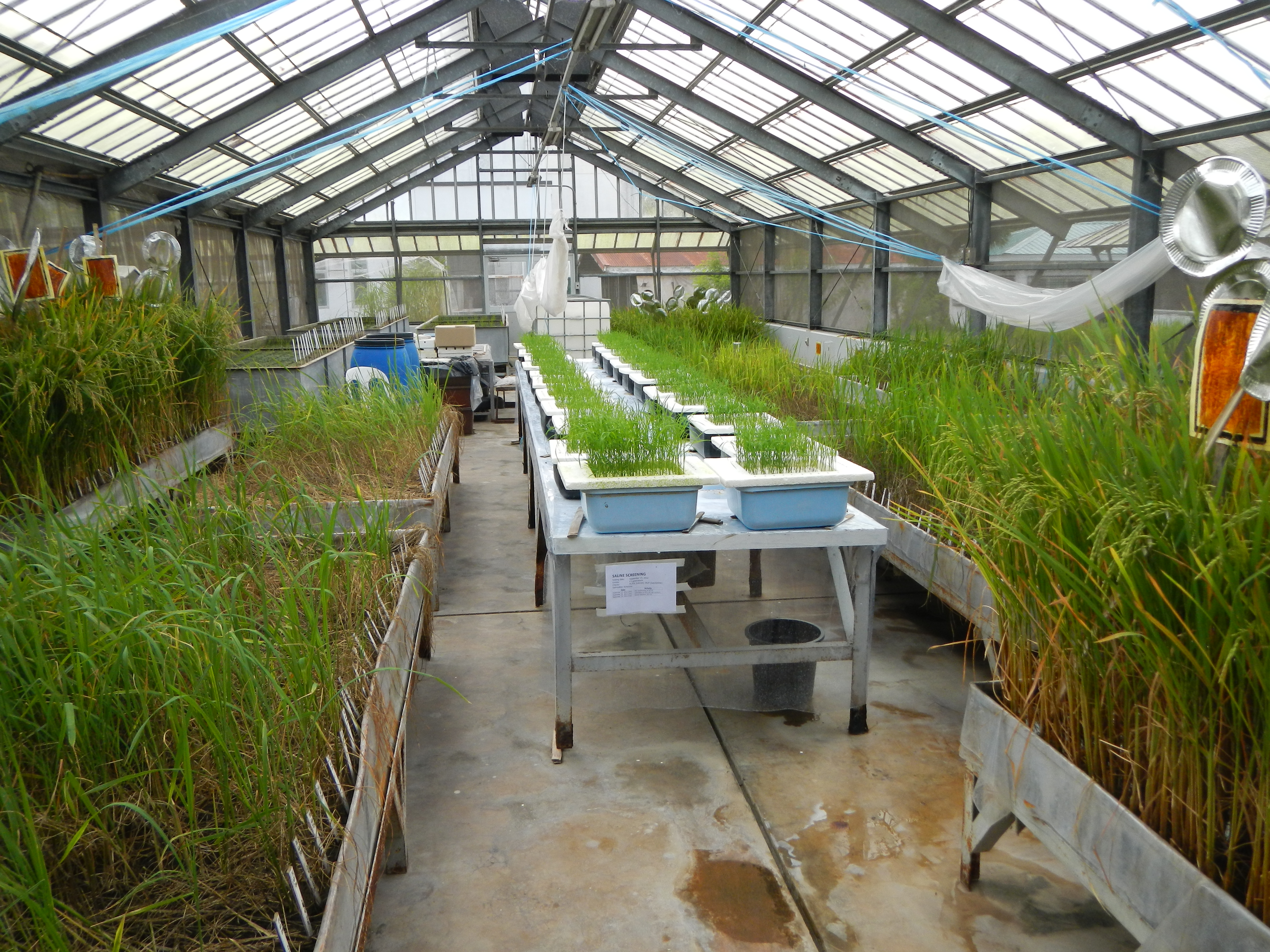
Rice greenhouse at PhilRice.

== See also ==
- Irrigated Rice Research Consortium
- International Rice Research Institute
