= Triciribine =

Chemical compound

Identifiers
- IUPAC name: 5-Methyl-1-(β-D-ribofuranosyl)-1,5-dihydro-1,4,5,6,8-pentaazaacenaphthylen-3-amine
- CAS Number: 35943-35-2
- ChemSpider: 58865
- UNII: 2421HMY9N6
- CompTox Dashboard (EPA): DTXSID6045743

Chemical and physical data
- Formula: C_{13}H_{16}N_{6}O_{4}
- Molar mass: 320.309 g·mol^{−1}
- 3D model (JSmol): Interactive image
- SMILES: CN1c2c3c(cn(c3ncn2)[C@H]4[C@@H]([C@@H]([C@H](O4)CO)O)O)C(=N1)N
- InChI: InChI=1S/C13H16N6O4/c1-18-11-7-5(10(14)17-18)2-19(12(7)16-4-15-11)13-9(22)8(21)6(3-20)23-13/h2,4,6,8-9,13,20-22H,3H2,1H3,(H2,14,17)/t6-,8-,9-,13-/m1/s1; Key:HOGVTUZUJGHKPL-HTVVRFAVSA-N

Triciribine is a cancer drug which was first synthesized in the 1970s and studied clinically in the 1980s and 1990s without success. Following the discovery in the early 2000s that the drug would be effective against tumours with hyperactivated Akt, it is now again under consideration in a variety of cancers. As PTX-200, the drug is currently in two early stage clinical trials in breast cancer and ovarian cancer being conducted by the small molecule drug development company Prescient Therapeutics.

== Background ==
Triciribine is a cell-permeable unnatural nucleoside that inhibits the phosphorylation and signalling of all three family members of Akt - Akt-1, Akt-2 and Akt-3. These are serine/threonine protein kinases in the phosphoinositide 3-kinase (PI3K) signalling pathway that play a critical role in the regulation of cell proliferation and survival. Following recruitment of Akt to the plasma membrane, phosphorylation at threonine 308 and serine 473 (Akt-1 numbering) by PDK-1 or PDK-2 results in full activation of the enzyme. Triciribine does not inhibit PI3K or PDK1, the direct upstream activators of Akt, nor does it inhibit PKC, PKA, ERK1/2, serum- and glucocorticoid-inducible kinase, p38, STAT3, or JNK signalling pathways.

== Early development, 1971-2004 ==
Triciribine, first synthesized in 1971, was found to have definite anti-cancer properties and a phosphate ester of the drug went into clinical trials in the 1980s because it had improved solubility. The trials found the drug to be toxic with limited efficacy. For example, a Phase I study in 1984 evaluating 33 advanced cancer patients using a five-day continuous infusion schedule found hyperglycemia, hepatotoxicity, and thrombocytopenia as common toxicities with only one patient's cancer improving. A Phase II trial in 1993 found only two responders out of 21 cervical cancer patients. Triciribine was widely considered to be a failed cancer drug until its 'rehabilitation' in the early 2000s.

== Development as an Akt inhibitor, 2004 - ==
In the early 2000s Said Sebti at the H. Lee Moffitt Cancer Center & Research Institute in Tampa, Fl and Jin Cheng at the University of South Florida established that Triciribine would be effective against tumours with hyperactivated AKT. By 2010 important parts of the mechanism of action for Triciribine had been elucidated, specifically its binding to the PH domain of AKT, thereby blocking its recruitment to the membrane, leading to subsequent inhibition of AKT phosphorylation.

- Pre-clinical work, 2004–2015. A number of pre-clinical studies confirmed the initial 2004 finding, including one showing synergy with tipifarnib and one showing effectiveness in pancreatic cancer cells.
- Phase I in solid tumors, 2011. This pharmacokinetic and pharmacodynamic study suggested that treatment with PTX-200 could inhibit phosphorylated AKT in tumours at doses that were tolerable.
- Phase I in advanced leukemia, 2013 (ClinicalTrials.gov identifier NCT00642031). This study, conducted at the Lee Moffitt as well as the M.D. Anderson Cancer Center, tested Triciribine as a single agent. Of the 32 evaluable patients, 15 had progressive disease and 17 had stable disease following a single cycle of treatment. Of the patients with stable disease, 3 patients with AML achieved ≥50% bone marrow blast reduction and a fourth patient with chronic myelomonocytic leukemia had marked spleen reduction and resolution of leukocytosis.

== Current development ==
As PTX-200, triciribine is currently in a Phase Ib/II study in breast cancer) and a Phase Ib trial in platinum resistant ovarian cancer. These trials completed in 2020 and 2019 respectively without publishing data, suggesting negative results.
