= Wiener Privatklinik =

Wiener Privatklinik or WPK (English: Private Clinic of Vienna) is a private hospital in Vienna, managed by Austrian doctor Prim. Dr. Walter Ebm and KommR Dipl. KH-Bw. Robert Nikolaus Winkler . The medical director is Prof. Dr. Rainer Kotz.

The hospital is equipped with four operating rooms, medical imaging technology, physical therapy and medical recovery services. It has nine competence centers, providing patients diagnosis and treatment in a wide variety of medical specialties: cardiovascular medicine, peripheral nerves surgery, oncology, orthopedics, sports medicine, trauma surgery, interventional radiology and microsurgery, plastic surgery, physical medicine and rehabilitation and investigations in aerospace medicine.

More than 300 collaborating doctors.

== Patients ==
The hospital has about 7,000 patients annually. About 40% are international patients and 20% of them are Romanian.

== Turnover ==
In 2015 Wiener Privatklinik had 70 million euros in revenue.

== The Academy Cancer Center ==
The hospital's Academy Cancer Center is one of the few medical centers in Europe that implement the concept of personalized medicine in oncology, offering patients the latest and most innovative personalized treatments against cancer, such as personalised targeted therapy and immunotherapy. These therapies complete the series of classic oncology treatments (chemotherapy, radiotherapy or surgery). The final diagnosis and treatment strategy are established following a histopathological examination of the tumor tissue.

The head of Academy Cancer Center is Univ.Prof. Dr. Christoph Zielinski, one of the most respected oncologists in Europe.

== Care protocols ==
Wiener Privatklinik represents a standard in the Austrian health care system in terms of care protocols. All staff is certified internationally, according to the official norms ISO 9001: 2015. Annual inspections are carried out to verify in detail the quality of patient care protocols, thereby ensuring strict control of hospital-acquired infections.
