= Said Sebti =

Said Sebti (Arabic: سيد سبتي, first name (pronounced [ˈsæjjɪd])) is an American cancer researcher who is Professor and Chairman of the Department of Drug Discovery at the H. Lee Moffitt Cancer Center & Research Institute in Tampa, Fl. Sebti is noted for his work to rehabilitate the 'failed' cancer drug Triciribine, now under development at the pharmaceutical company Prescient Therapeutics (ASX: PTX). Sebti is currently Chief Scientific Officer at Prescient Therapeutics.

== Background ==
Sebti earned his bachelor's degree in biochemistry from Washington State University in 1980 and his PhD in biochemistry from Purdue University in 1984. From 1985 to 1987 he did post-doctoral work in pharmacology at Yale University. He then spent three years as an assistant professor at the University of Pittsburgh before joining Moffitt Cancer Center in 1996 as Director of its Drug Discovery Program. He was named Professor and Chairman of the Department of Drug Discovery in 2002.

== Research work at the Moffitt Cancer Center ==
Normal cells often turn cancerous when signal transduction molecules become mutated. Sebti's work at Moffitt has centred on understanding aberrant signal transduction pathways and developing drugs which interfere with such pathways.

- The Ras superfamily. The Sebti lab has particularly focused on the role of the Ras superfamily, including the Ras and Rho subfamilies and the Ral subfamily.
- Kinases. Sebti's work on the kinase Akt led to his interest in Triciribine. Other kinases that have interested Sebti include Rho-associated kinase and Aurora kinase.
- STAT3. In 2003 the Sebti lab discovered JSI-124, a selective STAT3 signaling pathway inhibitor.
- Bcl/Mcl. The MCL1 member of the Bcl-2 family interests Sebti due to its role in preventing apoptosis. The Sebti lab is working on Mcl-1 inhibitors derived from a natural product called marinopyrrole A.
- FTase/GGTase. Sebti's work on farnesyltransferase and geranylgeranyltransferase led to the development of the drug now called PTX-100.
- The proteasome. In 2009 the Sebti lab discovered a new proteasome inhibitor called PI-083

== Prescient Therapeutics ==
Prescient Therapeutics originated in 2014 from two drug discovery programmes pioneered by the Sebti lab, PTX-200 and PTX-100.

- PTX-200. This programme involved the 'rehabilitation' of a previously failed cancer drug called triciribine. This drug, first synthesized in 1971, was trialled clinically in the 1980s and 1990s but with toxic effects and limited efficacy. However, in the 2000s Sebti and his collaborator Jin Cheng at the University of South Florida established that the drug would be effective against tumours with hyperactivated Akt.
- PTX-100. This programme involves a compound to block a cancer growth enzyme known as geranylgeranyltransferase type 1 (GGT-I), which plays a role in the inhibition of apoptosis. The compound, originally called GGTI-2418, was invented around 2009 Sebti and Andrew Hamilton, then a Professor of Chemistry at Yale University, now Vice Chancellor at the University of Oxford, invented GGTI.
