= Nyle C. Brady =

Photograph of Nyle C. Brady published in Extension Service Review, 1964)

Nyle C. Brady (25 October 1920 – 24 November 2015) was a professor of agronomy who specialized in soil science, writing an influential textbook,The Nature and Properties of Soils, that went into 14 editions during his lifetime.

Brady was born in Manassa, Colorado to Columbus Franklin (Frank) and Sarah Delila née Rasmussen (Sadie). After a BS in chemistry from Brigham Young University (1941) he pursued a doctorate at North Carolina State University receiving a PhD in 1947. He then became an assistant professor at Cornell University where he worked for 26 years. He headed the department of agronomy from 1955 and was director of the agricultural experiment station from 1963. In 1973 he became a director general at the International Rice Research Institute in Manila and returned to the US in 1981 to head the science and technology division of USAID.

The soil science textbook The Nature and Properties of Soils was first published in 1922, written by T. Lyttleton Lyon and Harry O. Buckman. Brady joined them as a co-author for the fifth edition, published in 1952 and would remain a co-author for 11 editions, including the 15th edition, published posthumously in 2017. From 1990 Brady was joined by Ray R. Weil as a co-author.
