= The Prostate =

- Discipline: Urology
- Language: English
- Edited by: Samuel Denmeade

Publication details
- History: 1980–present
- Publisher: John Wiley & Sons
- Frequency: 16/year
- Impact factor: 4.104 (2020)

Standard abbreviations
- ISO 4: Prostate

Indexing
- ISSN: 0270-4137 (print); 1097-0045 (web)
- OCLC no.: 37997599

Links
- Journal homepage; Online access; Online archive

The Prostate is a peer-reviewed medical journal devoted to the anatomy, physiology, and pathology of the prostate gland. The editor-in-chief is Samuel Denmeade (Johns Hopkins University).
