= Paul A. Hopper =

Australian bioentrepreneur (born 1956)

Paul A. Hopper (born 1956) is an Australian bioentrepreneur who has been associated since 2003 with a number of biotechnology companies, most of them publicly traded.

== Background ==
Born in PNG to a prominent post WW2 Australian colonial family, Hopper was educated in Sydney at the King's School, Parramatta and subsequently received a Bachelor of Arts degree majoring in Political Science from the University of New South Wales. In 1988 he cofounded Alpha Healthcare, an Australian private hospital group based in Sydney where was managing director until 1999. He began his career as a bioentrepreneur in the early 2000s.

== Australian Cancer Technology, 2003–2005 ==
Hopper's first biotechnology company was the ASX-listed Australian Cancer Technology Ltd, where he was CEO based in Sydney from September 2003 to February 2005. Among the drugs which Australian Cancer Technology worked on during this period was RP101, a small molecule which, by binding to heat shock protein 27 (Hsp27), was designed to prevent the induction of resistance to chemotherapy. By early 2005 Hopper had relocated from Sydney to San Diego in order to further develop Australian Cancer Technology, but shortly after the move he resigned.

== Investment banking in California, 2005–2014 ==
In California in November 2005 Hopper joined Cappello Global, an investment bank based in Los Angeles. Hopper had been the Australian representative of Cappello since 2002. At Cappello in California he became Head of the Life Sciences and Biotechnology Group as well as the Australia Desk. Over the next nine years Hopper was involved in the corporate development of a number of Life Science companies, including:

- Polynoma (Founder). This company is developing a therapeutic melanoma vaccine called seviprotimut-L, based on various antigens shed by three cultured melanoma cell lines. The vaccine's Phase III trial, which initiated in 2012, was one of the world's largest Phase III melanoma trials.
- Bone Medical (Executive chairman July 2005 to July 2007). This company was focused on oral delivery of large peptides using aromatic alcohols as absorption enhancers, with an initial focus on calcitonin and parathyroid hormone.
- Somnomed (Director July 2007 to September 2011). This company (ASX: SOM) is commercialising a dental appliance to treat sleep-disordered breathing.
- Cell Aquaculture (Executive chairman August 2007 to March 2008). This company's technology was designed to raise premium fish in a land-based recirculating system assembled with modular components.
- pSivida (Director July 2008 to January 2014). This company (Nasdaq: PSDV, ASX: PVA) is commercialising controlled-release drug delivery systems.
- Fibrocell Science (Director September 2009 to November 2010. This company (Nasdaq: FCSC) is developing regenerative fibroblast cells.
- iSonea (Director October 2010 to March 2012). This company (ASX: ISN) is commercialising a monitoring system for respiratory disorders.

== Current biotechnology companies, 2014 – ==
Hopper returned to Australia in 2015 in order to further develop a number of biotechnology companies of which was an executive. Hopper is currently on the board of three ASX-listed companies:

- Imugene (ASX: IMU, Executive chairman), a cancer immunotherapy company which he founded in October 2012 and which he helped structure in its present form in 2013, becoming Executive chairman in December of that year.
- Viralytics a company which was developing an oncolytic virus where Hopper was a Non-Executive Director since September 2008 and Chairman since November 2008. In 2018 Viralytics was acquired by Merck for A$502 million
- Vaxinia In 2018 Hopper founded private company Vaxinia, to license a novel oncolytic virus technology from the lab of Professor Yuman Fong at the City of Hope Cancer Centre in Los Angeles. Vaxinia was acquired by Imugene (ASX:IMU) in November 2019
- Prescient Therapeutics (ASX: PTX), a small molecule drug developer focused on cancer where Hopper was Founder and a director since May 2014 to Jan 2020.
- Glioblast In 2015 Hopper founded Glioblast based on technology licensed from Genentech for inhibition of the PI3K pathway in glioblastoma. Glioblast was acquired by ASX listed Kazia Therapeutics in 2016 (ASX:KZA)
- Arovella Therapeutics (ASX:ALA, former Chairman), a biotech company focusing on delivery of drugs across the oral mucosa using proprietary technology, where Hopper was Executive Chairman from May 2019 to June 2022
- Chimeric Therapeutics (ASX:CHM, Executive Chairman) In 2019 Hopper founded Chimeric Therapeutics to develop a solid tumor CAR T cell therapy licensed from the lab of Professors Christine Brown and Michael Barish, at the City of Hope Cancer Centre in Los Angeles. The company is currently enrolling patients in a Phase 1 clinical trial for glioblastoma. Chimeric Therapeutics listed on the ASX in January 2021 (ASX:CHM)
- Radiopharm Theranostics (ASX:RAD, Executive Chairman) In 2021 Hopper founded Radiopharm Theranostics to develop radiopharmaceutical products for diagnostic and therapeutic uses. The company has a pipeline of products in pre-clinical and clinical stages of development. Radiopharm Theranostics listed on the ASX in November 2021 (ASX:RAD)
