= Ursula Wiedermann =

Austrian medical scientist

Ursula Wiedermann (born 5 August 1965) is an Austrian medical scientist who has made significant contributions in the field of allergies and of cancer immunotherapy. She is currently Professor of Vaccinology at the Medical University of Vienna. Wiedermann's work in the field of B cell peptide vaccines led to the creation of HER-Vaxx, an immunotherapy for the treatment of HER-2-positive cancers. This vaccine is currently being taken into mid-stage clinical development in gastric cancer by the biotech company Imugene, where Wiedermann is Chief Scientific Officer.

== Background ==
After obtaining an MD degree from the Medical University of Vienna, Wiedermann gained a PhD in Immunology at the University of Gothenburg in Sweden, where the focus of her PhD work was mucosal immunity and vaccination. After returning to the Medical University of Vienna Wiedermann researched mucosal vaccination against allergic diseases and later began to look at vaccine development against infectious diseases and tumours as well as explore the issues of immune responsiveness and immune failures upon vaccination. Wiedermann became head of Vienna's Institute of Specific Prophylaxis and Tropical Medicine in 2004 and was named Professor of Vaccinology in 2006.

== Allergy research ==
A theme of Wiedermann's allergy research has been the treatment of allergies via mucosal tolerance induction with recombinant allergens, probiotics or other microbes. For a key 2001 paper in the International Archives of Allergy and Immunology Wiedermann used recombinant fragments of the birch pollen allergen Bet v I to induce mucosal tolerance in a mouse model of birch pollen allergy. In 2008 the Wiedermann lab challenged the 'microflora hypothesis', which holds that altered microflora contributed to allergies, by showing that Bet v 1 could induce mucosal tolerance in mice regardless of the presence or absence of microflora. In 2009 the Wiedermann lab provided some supporting evidence for the hygiene hypothesis of allergies by showing that infection with the intracellular parasite Toxoplasma gondii could prevent allergic immune responses in birch pollen allergic mice. In 2011 the Wiedermann lab showed in mice that probiotics could have anti-allergic effects against multiple allergens. In 2012 the Wiedermann lab showed that a fusion protein containing several allergens could treat birch pollen-related food allergy, in which patients are allergic to homologues of Bet v I. Also in 2012 the Wiedermann lab showed in mice that perinatal administration of Lactobacillus paracasei to pregnant and lactating mothers could protect against the development of airway inflammation in offspring.

== Cancer immunotherapy research ==
Beginning around 2004 Wiedermann began working on the technology that evolved into HER-Vaxx, a B cell peptide cancer immunotherapy that could induce an antibody response targeting HER-2 overexpressing tumours. Following on from favourable pre-clinical data, Wiedermann et al. ran a small 10-patient safety study of HER-Vaxx in ten patients with Stage IV metastatic breast cancer, albeit with low HER-2 expression. This study found the vaccine to be safe, with no observed cardiotoxicity. The patients developed anti-HER-2 antibodies and in vitro, those anti-HER-2 antibodies showed potent anti-tumour activity. Also in vitro, blood from the patients carried markers of a cellular immune response such as IL-2, IFN-γ and TNF-α (meaning that ultimately patients could be expected to develop T cells to kill the cancer cells, and not just antibodies). The vaccine took down the 'T reg' cell count in the patients, potentially indicating an overcoming of the cancer's immunoresistance. In 2012 a start-up company called Biolife Science was incorporated to develop this immunotherapy. Early-stage funding was secured from Australian and US investors in 2013, after which Biolife was taken public in December 2013 in a reverse takeover of an Australian drug development company called Imugene, whose name was retained after the merger. Wiedermann joined Imugene's Scientific Advisory Board in January 2014 and was named Chief Scientific Officer of Imugene in June 2015.
