= Samuel Denmeade =

American professor

Samuel Ray Denmeade is a professor of oncology, Urology and pharmacology and molecular sciences at the Johns Hopkins University School of Medicine. Over 10 of his published papers have each been cited over 100 times.

As a clinical oncologist Denmeade has been the lead investigator on clinical trials testing new hormone therapies for prostate cancer and is also a laboratory scientist focused on the development of novel ways to treat prostate cancer. His main research focus has been on the design and characterization of prodrugs and protoxins targeted for activation by cancer specific proteases. This research is based on the strategy that lethal drugs/toxins could be disguised as a prodrug and only released when exposed to the enzymatic activity of proteases such as PSA which are only present in its enzymatically active form in the tumor and not elsewhere in the body. One of these prodrugs termed G202 consists of an analog of the highly toxic natural product thapsigargin coupled to a peptide recognized as a substrate by the protease Prostate-Specific Membrane Antigen. The G202 prodrug is currently being evaluated for its toxicity and therapeutic effectiveness in clinical trials sponsored by GenSpera, Inc.

Denmeade is a co-founder of GenSpera and serves as its Chief Medical Advisor. He is also one of the co-inventors of PRX302, a modified form of the potent bacterial toxin proaerolysin reengineered for activation by the protease prostate-specific antigen (PSA). PRX302 is currently under clinical development by Protox (now Sophiris), Inc. as therapy for benign prostatic hyperplasia and prostate cancer.
