= International Rice Research Institute =

Agricultural research and training organization

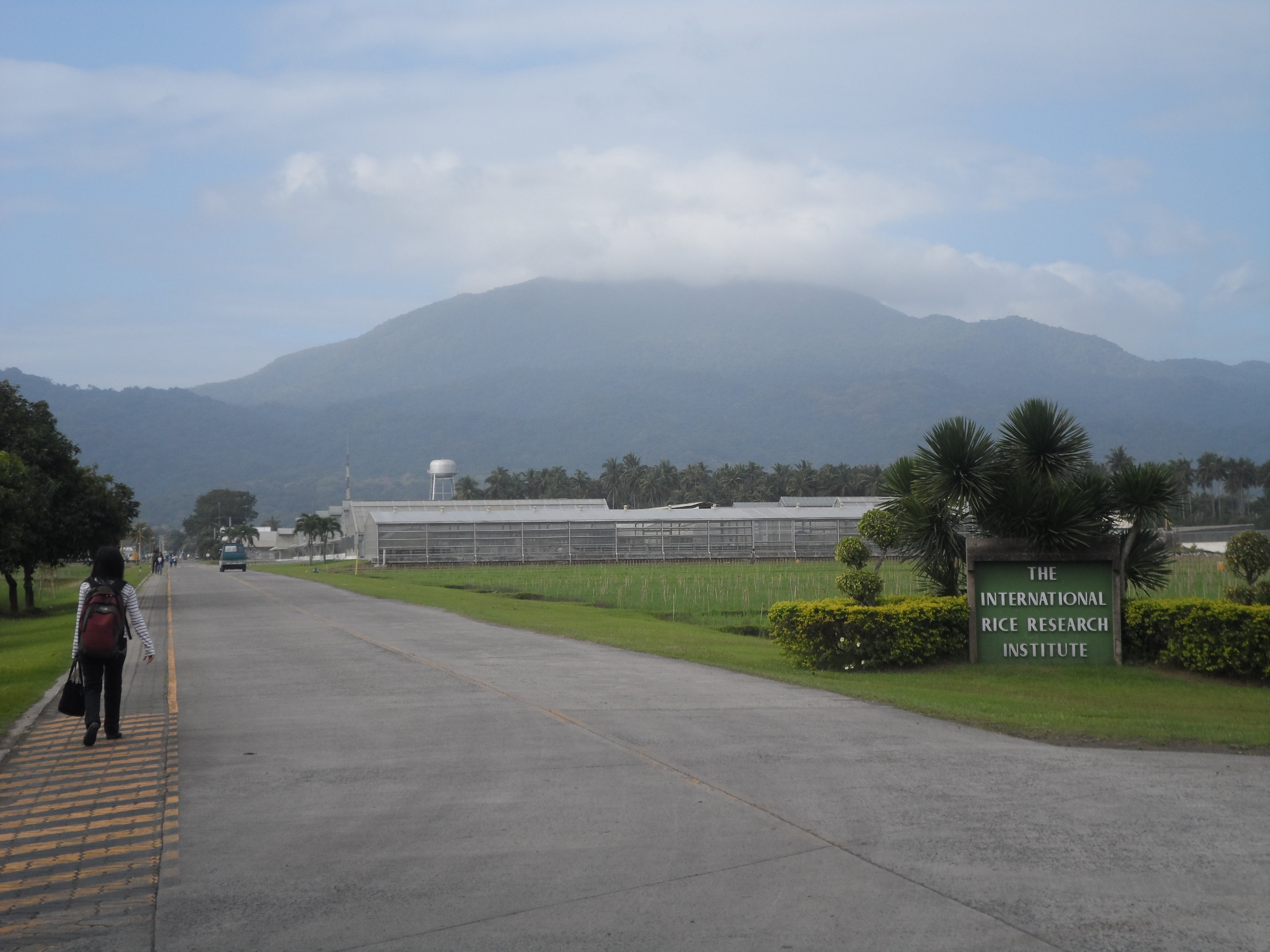
- Secondary entrance to the IRRI Headquarters at Los Baños, Laguna with Mt. Makiling in the background.

- Location within Laguna Location within Luzon Location within Philippines
- Formation: 1960; 66 years ago
- Type: Intergovernmental organization
- Headquarters: Los Baños, Laguna, Philippines
- Coordinates: 14.170°N 121.257°E
- Region served: Worldwide
- Director General: Dr. Yvonne Pinto
- Affiliations: CGIAR
- Budget: US$56.262 million (2022)
- Staff: 954 (2022)
- Website: www.irri.org

The International Rice Research Institute (IRRI) is an international agricultural research and training organization with its headquarters in Los Baños, Philippines, and offices in seventeen countries. IRRI is known for its work in developing rice varieties that contributed to the Green Revolution in the 1960s which preempted the famine in Asia.

The institute was established in 1960 aims to reduce poverty and hunger, improve the health of rice farmers and consumers, and ensure environmental sustainability of rice farming. It advances its mission through collaborative research, partnerships, and the strengthening of the national agricultural research and extension systems of the countries IRRI works in.

IRRI is one of 15 agricultural research centers in the world that form the CGIAR Consortium of International Agricultural Research Centers, a global partnership of organizations engaged in research on food security. It is also the largest non-profit agricultural research center in Asia.

== Origins ==
IRRI was established in 1960 with the support of the Ford Foundation, the Rockefeller Foundation, and the Government of the Philippines. It was intended to be an autonomous, philanthropic, tax-free, non-profit, non-stock organization designed to carry out the principal objective of conducting "basic research on the rice plant, on all phases of rice production, management, distribution and utilization with a view to attaining nutritive and economic advantage or benefit for the people of Asia and other major rice-growing areas through improvement in quality and quantity of rice."

An International treaty titled: Agreement Recognising the International Legal Personality of the International Rice Research Institute was tabled in Manila on 19 May 1995.

== Impact ==
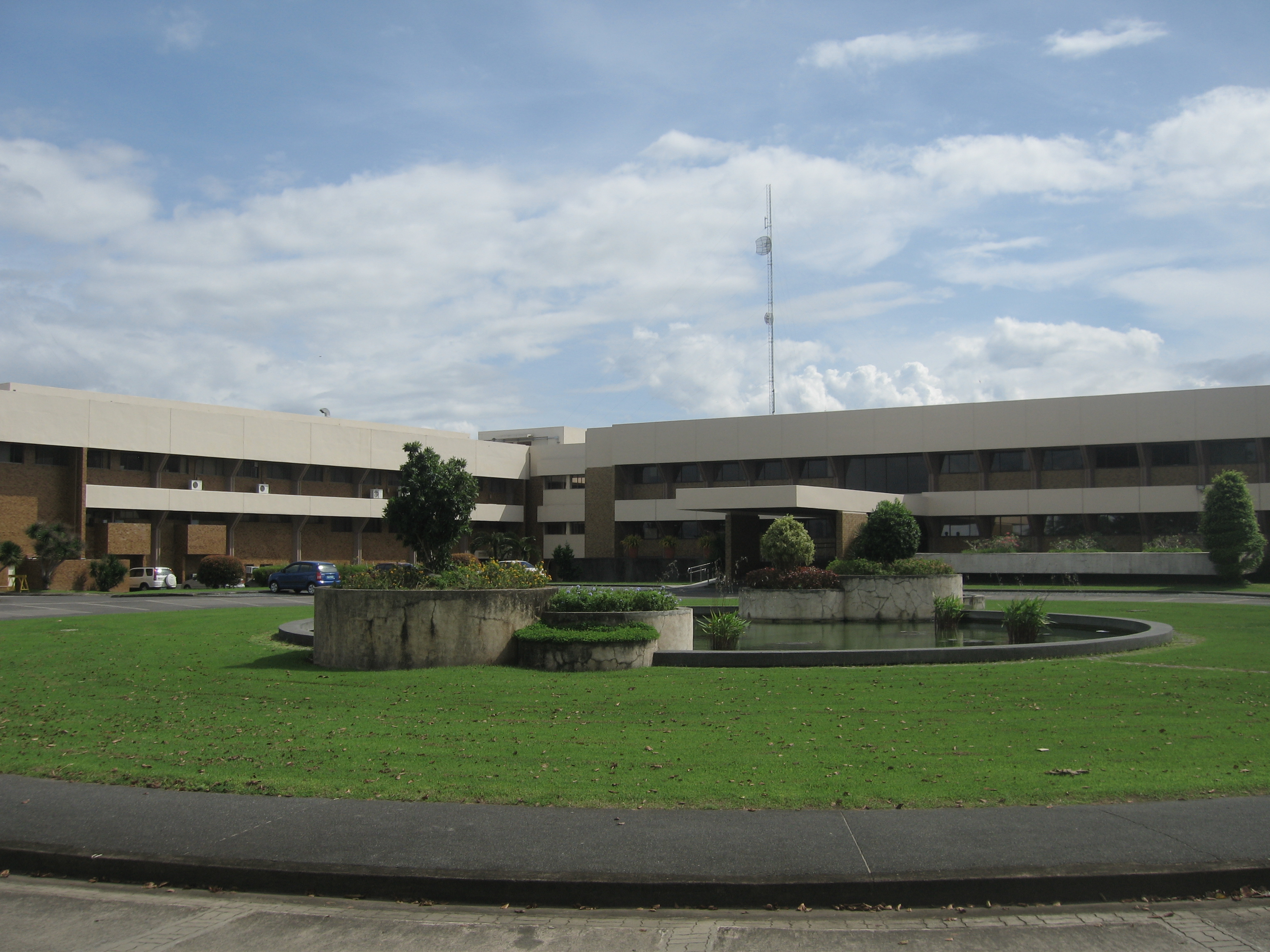
NC Brady Laboratory Building - part of the "Research Center" cluster of buildings built in the 1970s. Taken from DL Umali Bldg.

IRRI is well known for its contribution to the "Green Revolution" movement in Asia during the late 1960s and 1970s, which involved the breeding of "semi-dwarf" varieties of rice that were less likely to lodge (fall over). IRRI's semi-dwarf varieties, including the famous IR8, saved India from famine in the 1960s. The varieties developed at IRRI, known as IR varieties, are well accepted in many Asian countries. In 2005, it was estimated that 60% of the world's rice area was planted to IRRI-bred rice varieties or their progenies.

A report published by the Australian Centre for International Agricultural Research in 2011 assessed the impact of IRRI's breeding work in three countries in South East Asia between 1985 and 2009. It found IRRI's breeding work delivered an annual benefit of US$1.46 billion and boosted rice yields up to 13%.

IRRI, the Chinese Academy of Agricultural Sciences, and BGI (formerly known as the Beijing Genomics Institute) have "identified the exact genetic makeup of more than 3,000 different families of rice for the first time in what is being heralded as a major advancement in rice science."

For five decades, IRRI has provided a place for scientists and future leaders in rice research to learn. Since 1964, over 15,000 scientists have undergone training at IRRI to conduct rice research.

== Golden rice ==
IRRI is pursuing the development of "golden rice". Geneticists inserted two genes into the rice plant that allows it to produce beta carotene, which makes its grains yellow. Because the human body converts beta carotene to vitamin A, golden rice has the potential to dramatically improve the lives of millions of people around the world, particularly in Africa and Southeast Asia, where vitamin A deficiency is an especially common malady that can cause blindness and increases the risk of death from disease. Children are particularly vulnerable; according to the World Health Organization, "An estimated 250,000 to 500,000 vitamin A-deficient children become blind every year, half of them dying within 12 months of losing their sight". In August 2013, anti-genetically modified organism protestors broke into IRRI's research facilities and destroyed field trials of golden rice. The Bill and Melinda Gates Foundation supported IRRI in its development of golden rice.

== Research ==
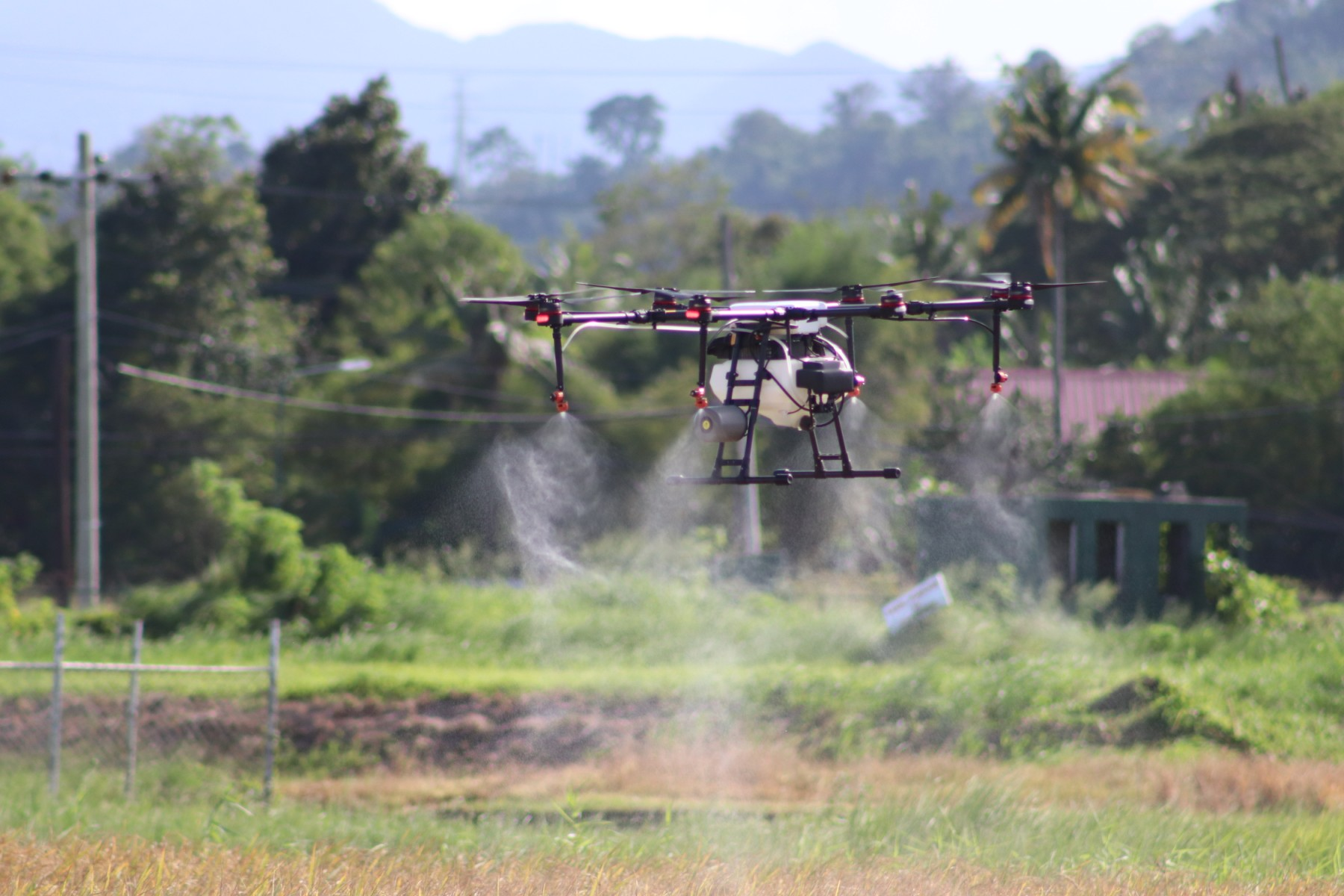
Demonstration of a drone for rice cultivation at the IRRI.

IRRI's website states that their research themes consist of:

THEME 1: Harnessing genetic diversity to chart new productivity, quality, and health horizons

THEME 2: Accelerating the development, delivery, and adoption of improved rice varieties

THEME 3: Ecological and sustainable management of rice-based production systems

THEME 4: Extracting more value from rice harvests through improved quality, processing, market systems, and new products

THEME 5: Technology evaluations, targeting, and policy options for enhanced impact

THEME 6: Supporting the growth of the global rice sector

Additionally, the organisation describes their expertise as including:

conserving, understanding, sharing, and using rice genetic diversity; breeding and delivering new varieties; developing and sharing improved crop and environmental management practices; adding to the economic and nutritional value of rice; broadening our impact by supporting strategic policy and market development; and facilitating large-scale adoption of technologies.

In 2010, the Global Rice Science Partnership (GRiSP) was launched, which IRRI leads in Asia, the Africa Rice Center (AfricaRice) leads in Africa, and International Center for Tropical Agriculture (CIAT) leads in Latin America. It aims to "dramatically improve the ability of rice farmers to feed growing populations in some of the world's poorest nations".

== Awards ==
In 1969, IRRI was awarded the Ramon Magsaysay Award for International Understanding. The Ramon Magsaysay Award is an annual award was established in 1957 by the trustees of the Rockefeller Brothers Fund based in New York City, with the concurrence of the Philippine government, to "perpetuate former Philippine President Ramon Magsaysay's example of integrity in governance, courageous service to the people, and pragmatic idealism within a democratic society". This award is Asia's highest honor and widely regarded as the Asian equivalent to the Nobel Prize. The Ramon Magsaysay Award Foundation posited that IRRI represented "the first coordinated international attempt in the tropics to solve a major problem of world agriculture", while also stating:

Distilling more than three millennia of accumulated insight in cultivating man's leading cereal crop, the International Rice Research Institute, with its creation of "miracle rice", inaugurated a "green revolution", promising nearly one-half of humanity the prospect of suffficiency in its staple food.

Additionally, IRRI received the 2010 BBVA Foundation Frontiers of Knowledge Award in the category of Development Cooperation. This was awarded for the organization's contribution to "reducing poverty and hunger in the world by means of rice research and farmer training", and "for the quality of its research work, which has led to the development of new rice varieties adapted to different cropping areas in Asia and providing improved yield and sustainability across multiple climate regimes". IRRI was nominated for the award by Japan's National Graduate Institute for Policy Studies. The award jury also pointed to:

IRRI's success in transferring the results of its research, by working with local teams and organizations in Asian and sub-Saharan countries and making its varieties freely available to farmers. By this means, the IRRI has secured the effective dissemination of its innovations with the resultant increase in production of this basic crop.

== Facilities ==
IRRI's headquarters in the Philippines is located on a 252 hectares (620 acres) experimental farm with modern laboratories and glasshouses, and a training center. The land is owned by the University of the Philippines Los Baños and is leased to the institute. It also houses the International Rice Genebank and Riceworld Museum. The International Rice Genebank holds more than 127,000 accessions of rice and wild relatives and is the biggest collection of rice genetic diversity in the world. The International Network for Genetic Evaluation of Rice (INGER) was created by IRRI in 1975 as the International Rice Testing Program IRTP. INGER accepts accessions and then holds, multiplies, and distributes them to researchers without restriction, including restriction on commercial use.

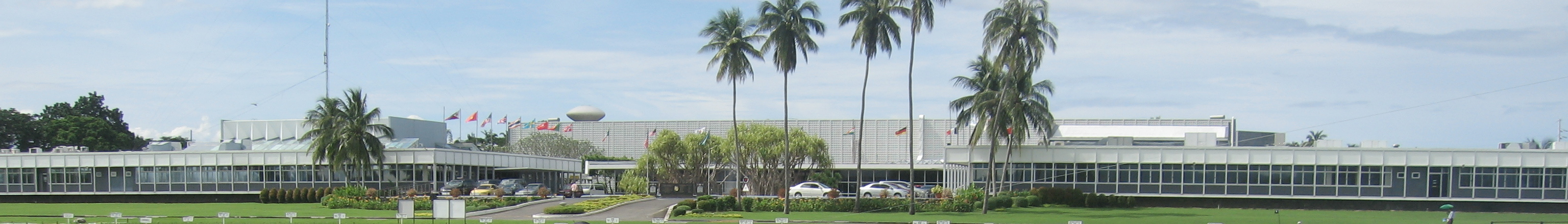
Panoramic view of the three main/initial buildings of the International Rice Research Institute in November 2010

In April 2015, descendants of the clan of national hero Jose Rizal staked claims to lands now owned by the UP System through UPLB and a large portion of which are leased to IRRI. They allege that such were taken unjustly from them during the regime of Ferdinand Marcos.

== Countries with offices ==
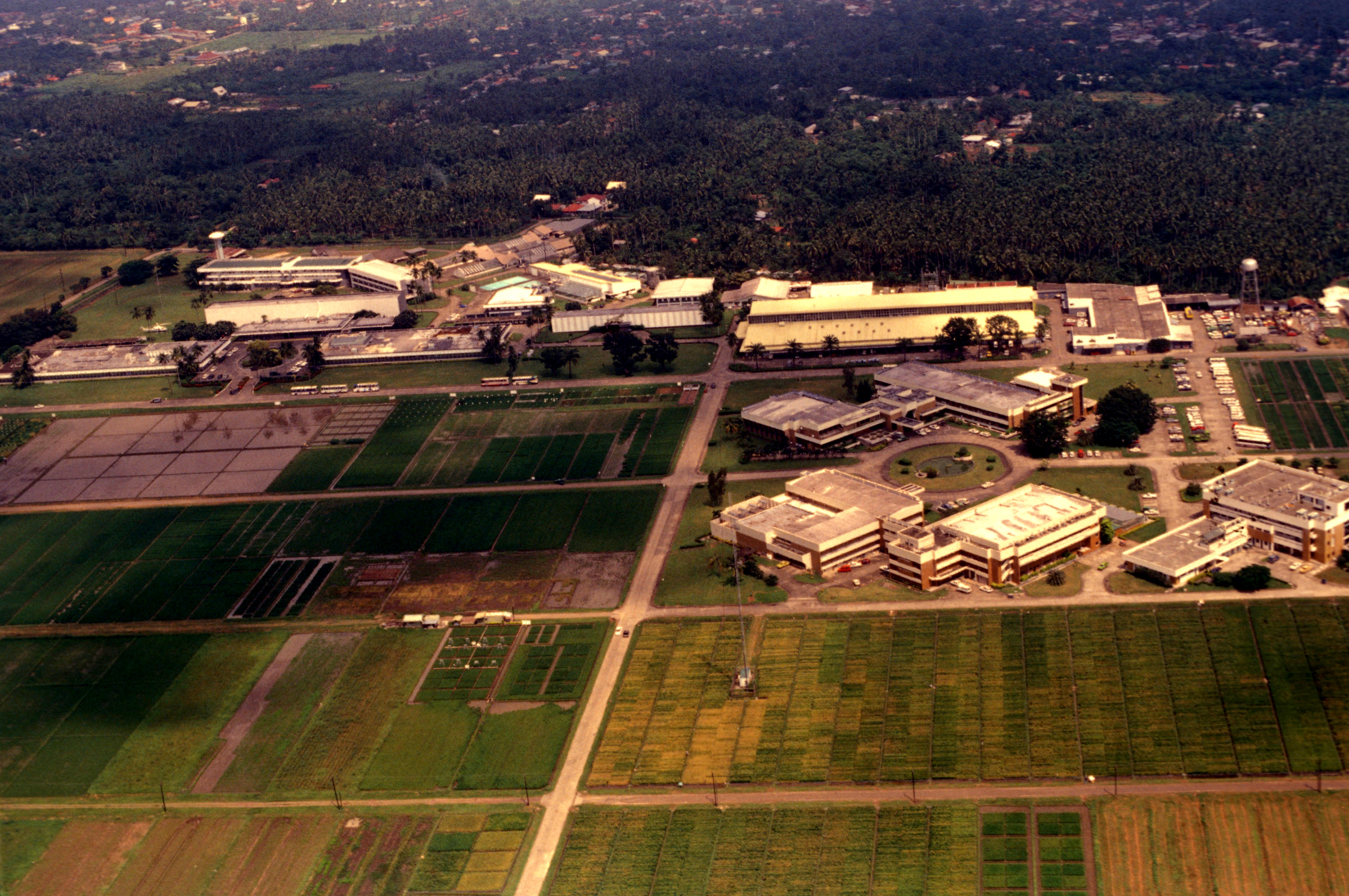
Aerial view of the Philippine headquarters compound in 2006

IRRI has offices in the following rice growing countries in Asia and Africa:

- Bangladesh
- Burundi
- Cambodia
- China
- India
- Indonesia
- Japan
- Laos
- Mozambique
- Myanmar
- Nepal
- Philippines
- Singapore
- South Korea
- Sri Lanka
- Thailand
- Vietnam

== See also ==
- Banaue Rice Terraces
- Irrigated Rice Research Consortium
- Rice paddy
