= Response evaluation criteria in solid tumors =

Cancer treatment evaluation system

Response evaluation criteria in solid tumors (RECIST) is a set of published rules that define when tumors in cancer patients improve ("respond"), stay the same ("stabilize"), or worsen ("progress") during treatment. The criteria were published in February 2000 by an international collaboration including the European Organisation for Research and Treatment of Cancer (EORTC), National Cancer Institute of the United States, and the National Cancer Institute of Canada Clinical Trials Group. Today, the majority of clinical trials evaluating cancer treatments for objective response in solid tumors use RECIST. These criteria were developed and published in February 2000, and subsequently updated in 2009.

The criteria are specifically not meant to determine whether patients have improved or not, as these are tumor-centric, not patient centric criteria. This distinction must be made by both the treating physicians and the cancer patients themselves. Many oncologists in their daily clinical practice follow their patients' malignant disease by means of repeated imaging studies and make decisions about continuing therapy on the basis of both objective and symptomatic criteria. It is not intended that these RECIST guidelines play a role in that decision making, except if determined appropriate by the treating oncologist.

== Features ==
The RECIST specification establishes a minimum size for measurable lesions, limits the number of lesions to follow and standardizes unidimensional measures.

== Eligibility ==
- Only patients with measurable disease at baseline should be included in protocols where objective tumor response is the primary endpoint.

Measurable disease – the presence of at least one measurable lesion. If the measurable disease is restricted to a solitary lesion, its neoplastic nature should be confirmed by cytology/histology.

Measurable lesions – lesions that can be accurately measured in at least one dimension with longest diameter ≥20 mm using conventional techniques or ≥10 mm by spiral CT scan.

Non-measurable lesions – all other lesions, including small lesions (longest diameter <20 mm with conventional techniques or <10 mm with spiral CT scan), i.e., bone lesions, leptomeningeal disease, ascites, pleural/pericardial effusion, inflammatory breast disease, lymphangitis cutis/pulmonis, cystic lesions, and also abdominal masses that are not confirmed and followed by imaging techniques.

- All measurements should be taken and recorded in metric notation, using a ruler or calipers. All baseline evaluations should be performed as closely as possible to the beginning of treatment and never more than 4 weeks before the beginning of treatment.
- The same method of assessment and the same technique should be used to characterize each identified and reported lesion at baseline and during follow-up.
- Clinical lesions will only be considered measurable when they are superficial (e.g., skin nodules and palpable lymph nodes). For the case of skin lesions, documentation by color photography, including a ruler to estimate the size of the lesion, is recommended.

== Methods of measurement ==
- CT and MRI are the best currently available and reproducible methods to measure target lesions selected for response assessment. Conventional CT and MRI should be performed with cuts of 10 mm or less in slice thickness contiguously. Spiral CT should be performed using a 5 mm contiguous reconstruction algorithm. This applies to tumors of the chest, abdomen and pelvis. Head and neck tumors and those of extremities usually require specific protocols.
- Lesions on chest X-ray are acceptable as measurable lesions when they are clearly defined and surrounded by aerated lung. However, CT is preferable.
- When the primary endpoint of the study is objective response evaluation, ultrasound (US) should not be used to measure tumor lesions. It is, however, a possible alternative to clinical measurements of superficial palpable lymph nodes, subcutaneous lesions and thyroid nodules. US might also be useful to confirm the complete disappearance of superficial lesions usually assessed by clinical examination.
- The utilization of endoscopy and laparoscopy for objective tumor evaluation has not yet been fully and widely validated. Their uses in this specific context require sophisticated equipment and a high level of expertise that may only be available in some centers. Therefore, the utilization of such techniques for objective tumor response should be restricted to validation purposes in specialized centers. However, such techniques can be useful in confirming complete pathological response when biopsies are obtained.
- Tumor markers alone cannot be used to assess response. If markers are initially above the upper normal limit, they must normalize for a patient to be considered in complete clinical response when all lesions have disappeared.
- Cytology and histology can be used to differentiate between PR and CR in rare cases (e.g., after treatment to differentiate between residual benign lesions and residual malignant lesions in tumor types such as germ cell tumors).

== Baseline documentation of "target" and "non-target" lesions ==
- All measurable lesions up to a maximum of 2 lesions per organ and 5 lesions in total, representative of all involved organs should be identified as target lesions and recorded and measured at baseline.
- Target lesions should be selected on the basis of their size (lesions with the longest diameter) and their suitability for accurate repeated measurements (either by imaging techniques or clinically).
- A sum of the longest diameter (LD) for all target lesions will be calculated and reported as the baseline sum LD. The baseline sum LD will be used as reference by which to characterize the objective tumor response.
- All other lesions (or sites of disease) should be identified as non-target lesions and should also be recorded at baseline. Measurements of these lesions are not required, but the presence or absence of each should be noted throughout follow-up.

== Response criteria ==
Evaluation of target lesions

- Complete response (CR): Disappearance of all target lesions
- Partial response (PR): At least a 30% decrease in the sum of the LD of target lesions, taking as reference the baseline sum LD
- Stable disease (SD): Neither sufficient shrinkage to qualify for PR nor sufficient increase to qualify for PD, taking as reference the smallest sum LD since the treatment started
- Progressive disease (PD): At least a 20% increase in the sum of the LD of target lesions, taking as reference the smallest sum LD recorded since the treatment started or the appearance of one or more new lesions

Evaluation of non-target lesions

- Complete response (CR): Disappearance of all non-target lesions and normalization of tumor marker level
- Incomplete response or stable disease (SD): Persistence of one or more non-target lesion(s) or/and maintenance of tumor marker level above the normal limits
- Progressive disease (PD): Appearance of one or more new lesions and/or unequivocal progression of existing non-target lesions

Evaluation of best overall response

The best overall response is the best response recorded from the start of the treatment until disease progression/recurrence (taking as reference for PD the smallest measurements recorded since the treatment started). In general, the patient's best response assignment will depend on the achievement of both measurement and confirmation criteria

- Patients with a global deterioration of health status requiring discontinuation of treatment without objective evidence of disease progression at that time should be classified as having “symptomatic deterioration”. Every effort should be made to document the objective progression even after discontinuation of treatment.
- In some circumstances it may be difficult to distinguish residual disease from normal tissue. When the evaluation of complete response depends on this determination, it is recommended that the residual lesion be investigated (fine needle aspirate/biopsy) to confirm the complete response status.

== Confirmation ==
- The main goal of confirmation of objective response is to avoid overestimating the response rate observed. In cases where confirmation of response is not feasible, it should be made clear when reporting the outcome of such studies that the responses are not confirmed.
- To be assigned a status of PR or CR, changes in tumor measurements must be confirmed by repeat assessments that should be performed no less than 4 weeks after the criteria for response are first met. Longer intervals as determined by the study protocol may also be appropriate.
- In the case of SD, follow-up measurements must have met the SD criteria at least once after study entry at a minimum interval (in general, not less than 6–8 weeks) that is defined in the study protocol

Duration of overall response

- The duration of overall response is measured from the time measurement criteria are met for CR or PR (whichever status is recorded first) until the first date that recurrence or PD is objectively documented, taking as reference for PD the smallest measurements recorded since the treatment started.

== Duration of stable disease ==
- SD is measured from the start of the treatment until the criteria for disease progression are met, taking as reference the smallest measurements recorded since the treatment started.
- The clinical relevance of the duration of SD varies for different tumor types and grades. Therefore, it is highly recommended that the protocol specify the minimal time interval required between two measurements for determination of SD. This time interval should take into account the expected clinical benefit that such a status may bring to the population under study.

Response review

- For trials where the response rate is the primary endpoint it is strongly recommended that all responses be reviewed by an expert(s) independent of the study at the study's completion. Simultaneous review of the patients’ files and radiological images is the best approach.

Reporting of results

- All patients included in the study must be assessed for response to treatment, even if there are major protocol treatment deviations or if they are ineligible. Each patient will be assigned one of the following categories: 1) complete response, 2) partial response, 3) stable disease, 4) progressive disease, 5) early death from malignant disease, 6) early death from toxicity, 7) early death because of other cause, or 9) unknown (not assessable, insufficient data).
- All of the patients who met the eligibility criteria should be included in the main analysis of the response rate. Patients in response categories 4-9 should be considered as failing to respond to treatment (disease progression). Thus, an incorrect treatment schedule or drug administration does not result in exclusion from the analysis of the response rate. Precise definitions for categories 4-9 will be protocol specific.
- All conclusions should be based on all eligible patients.
- Subanalyses may then be performed on the basis of a subset of patients, excluding those for whom major protocol deviations have been identified (e.g., early death due to other reasons, early discontinuation of treatment, major protocol violations, etc.). However, these subanalyses may not serve as the basis for drawing conclusions concerning treatment efficacy, and the reasons for excluding patients from the analysis should be clearly reported.
- The 95% confidence intervals should be provided.

== Immuno-oncology ==
The RECIST criteria present problems for immunotherapies so around 2009 the immune-related response criteria were developed and are used in some immunotherapy clinical trials.

== History ==
The World Health Organization published the first tumour response criteria in 1981. However the specification documents were unclear which led to criteria adjustments and inconsistent conclusions. In the mid-1990s, an International Working Party was created to simplify and standardize response criteria; it then published RECIST in 2000. These new criteria have been widely adopted and embraced by the regulatory authorities. The mean response rate for new cancer drugs approved by the U.S. Food and Drug Administration, expressed as relative risk, ranges between 1.38x and 2.37x.

== See also ==
- PET response criteria in solid tumors (PERCIST)
- Surveillance, Epidemiology, and End Results database (SEER)

== Citation / External links ==
- RECIST article published in JNCI
- Guidelines and information from European Organization for Research and Treatment in Cancer
- Eur J Cancer. 2009 Jan;45(2):228-47. doi:10.1016/j.ejca.2008.10.026. New response evaluation criteria in solid tumours: revised RECIST guideline (version 1.1).Guidelines (version 1.1)
- Full presentation of newer guideline (14.7 MB; .pdf)
