= Prescient Therapeutics =

Drug company

Prescient Therapeutics Ltd
- Type: Public
- Traded as: ASX: PTX
- Industry: Biotechnology
- Founded: 2014
- Headquarters: Melbourne, Australia
- Key people: James McDonnell (CEO); Rebecca Tunstall (COO); Rosalind Wilson (CMO); Upaly Bahadure (Director - Clinical Affairs & Operations); Mariam Mansour (Director - Clinical Development & Translational Sciences); Luis Malaver-Ortega (Director - Research and Development); James Campbell (Non-executive chairman)
- Products: PTX-100, OmniCAR, CellPryme
- Website: www.ptxtherapeutics.com

Prescient Therapeutics (ASX: PTX) is a clinical-stage oncology company developing targeted therapies. Prescient's technologies emanate from prestigious world class centres including Yale, Penn, Oxford and Moffitt.

== History ==
Prescient Therapeutics Ltd (Prescient) was created in 2014 by bringing together two small molecule drug assets from separate US private companies (Pathway Oncology for PTX-100 and AKTivate Therapeutics for PTX-200) into the existing ASX-listed shell company Virax Holdings Ltd (Virax). Paul Hopper, an Australian bio-entrepreneur, looking to access public markets to help develop the PTX-100 & PTX-200 assets, helped coordinate sequential reverse takeovers wherein Virax first acquired Pathway Oncology (deal announced 17 March 2014, completed 30 May 2014) and then AKTivate Therapeutics (deal announced 17 October 2014, completed 11 December 2014). Virax then changed its name to Prescient Therapeutics in December 2014.

Prescient expanded its focus into cellular therapies in 2019 with the in-house development of cell therapy enhancement platform, CellPryme, and in May 2020 announced the development of its universal immune receptor platform OmniCAR from technologies developed at University of Pennsylvania (Penn) and Oxford University.

== PTX-100 ==
PTX-100 is a first in class compound with the ability to block an important cancer growth enzyme known as geranylgeranyl transferase-1(GGT-1). This enzyme, by post translationally modifying the small GTPase Rho with isoprenoid lipids, plays a role in malignant transformation of cells and the inhibition of apoptosis. PTX-100 disrupts oncogenic Ras pathways by inhibiting the activation of Rho, Rac and Ral circuits in cancer cells, leading to apoptosis (death) of cancer cells. PTX-100 is licensed by Prescient from Yale University, and was co-invented by Prescient Founding Scientist, Professor Said Sebti, and Professor Andrew Hamilton.

PTX-100 demonstrated safety and early clinical activity in a previous Phase 1 study and recent PK/PD basket study of haematological and solid malignancies. PTX-100 is now in a Phase 1b expansion cohort study in T cell lymphomas, where it has shown encouraging efficacy signals and safety. The lead investigator on the study is Professor Miles Prince, AM. A global Phase 2 study focussing on cutaneous T-cell lymphomas is due to start in early 2025.

PTX-100 was granted Orphan Drug Designation by the US FDA for the treatment of all T-cell lymphomas.

== OmniCAR ==
OmniCAR is a universal immune receptor platform enabling controllable T-cell activity and multi-antigen targeting with a single cell product. It is the first universal immune receptor allowing post-translational covalent loading of binders to T-cells.

Prescient developed the OmniCAR platform by combining a universal immune receptor technology invented at University of Pennsylvania (Penn) by Dr. Daniel J. Powell, Jr. and Dr. Andrew Tsourkas, with a molecular binding system (termed SpyTag/SpyCatcher) licensed from the University of Oxford, together with other Prescient proprietary technologies.

The resultant modular CAR system, named OmniCAR, decouples antigen recognition from the T-cell signalling domain. The targeting ligand can then be administered and titrated separately to the CAR-T cells thereby creating on-demand and controllable T-cell activity post infusion. This separation of the ligand dosing provides potential safety advantages through increased control of the resultant CAR activation throughout the therapy, as well as ability to target multiple antigens, either simultaneously or sequentially, whilst allowing continual re-arming to generate, regulate and diversify a sustained T-cell response over time. Prescient notes this may assist in overcoming T-cell exhaustion and persistence, and these features collectively provide potential advantages in solid tumours which are characterised by antigen heterogeneity, antigen escape and a hostile tumour microenvironment.

Prescient's initial focus for OmniCAR is CAR-T for oncology. However, the OmniCAR platform can be applied to any immune cell type (including T-cells, NK cells, Macrophages) and combine with any target binding ligand (scFv, Antibody, Aptamers, Labels for imaging) enabling a potential modular approach applicable to the broader field of cell therapies. OmniCAR is relevant for both autologous or allogeneic approaches.

=== OmniCAR Preclinical Milestones ===
Prescient has entered a collaboration agreement with Peter MacCallum Cancer Centre (Peter Mac), one of the world leaders in CAR-T research and manufacturing, to develop the OmniCAR technology.

Since announcing the OmniCAR platform in May 2020 Prescient has released results of several preclinical milestones;

- Immunogenic profile: In-silico tests confirmed non-immunogenic profile of OmniCAR’s key components (SpyTag/ SpyCatcher), demonstrating a lower immunogenicity than approved humanised antibodies and comparable with human antibodies.
- Dose response: OmniCAR exhibited dose-dependent tumour killing activity, with the ability to control OmniCAR-T cell activity commensurate with amount of binder administered.
- Re-arming: OmniCAR-T cells could be pre-armed, washed, rested and then re-armed to exhibit the same levels and kinetics of cytotoxicity as pre-armed OmniCAR-T cells.
- Sequential arming and re-direction: OmniCAR was tested sequentially against a co-culture of GBM cells expressing antigens Her2 or EGFRviii where it was demonstrated OmniCAR cells can be redirected to a different antigen target with high target cytotoxicity immediately upon the administration of a different SpyTagged binder without needing new cells.

In August 2022 Prescient announced a manufacturing services agreement with Q-Gen Cell Therapeutics who will produce its OmniCAR cell lines for Prescient's in-house clinical trials.

== Cell Therapy Enhancements ==
=== CellPryme-M ===
CellPryme-M, developed by Prescient in partnership with Peter Mac, was announced in June 2022 as a cell therapy enhancement platform technology that produces superior cells during the cell manufacturing process. During a single, rapid step during manufacturing, cells are pushed toward phenotypes with favourable characteristics for CAR-T including more central memory T-cells, more CD4+ helper cells, cells with more chemokine receptors and greater genomic stability. In pre-clinical trials Prescient demonstrated cells produced by CellPryme-M are less prone to exhaustion, enabling longer duration of cancer killing activity, and are capable of improved tumour trafficking and penetrance compared to the current generation of CAR-T cells. Resultantly, CellPryme-M CAR-T cells performed significantly better than conventional CAR-T cells in highly aggressive solid cancer models.

=== CellPryme-A ===
CellPryme-A, developed by Prescient in partnership with Peter Mac, was announced in September 2022 as an adjuvant / neoadjuvant therapy designed to be administered intravenously to patients alongside cellular immunotherapy to help them overcome a suppressive tumour microenvironment. In preclinical studies using a solid tumour murine model (HER2+ MC38 colon carcinoma) CellPryme-A significantly decreased suppressive regulatory T cells; increased expansion of CAR-T cells in vivo; increased tumour penetration of CAR-T cells. CellPryme-A significantly improved both tumour killing and host survival and the effects were magnified when CellPryme-A was used in conjunction with CellPryme-M.

Prescient intends to use both its CellPryme-M and CellPryme-A technologies for its own OmniCAR programs in addition to offering it to other companies under licence to enhance their respective cell therapy products.
