= Christoph Zielinski =

Austrian physician and cancer researcher (born 1952)

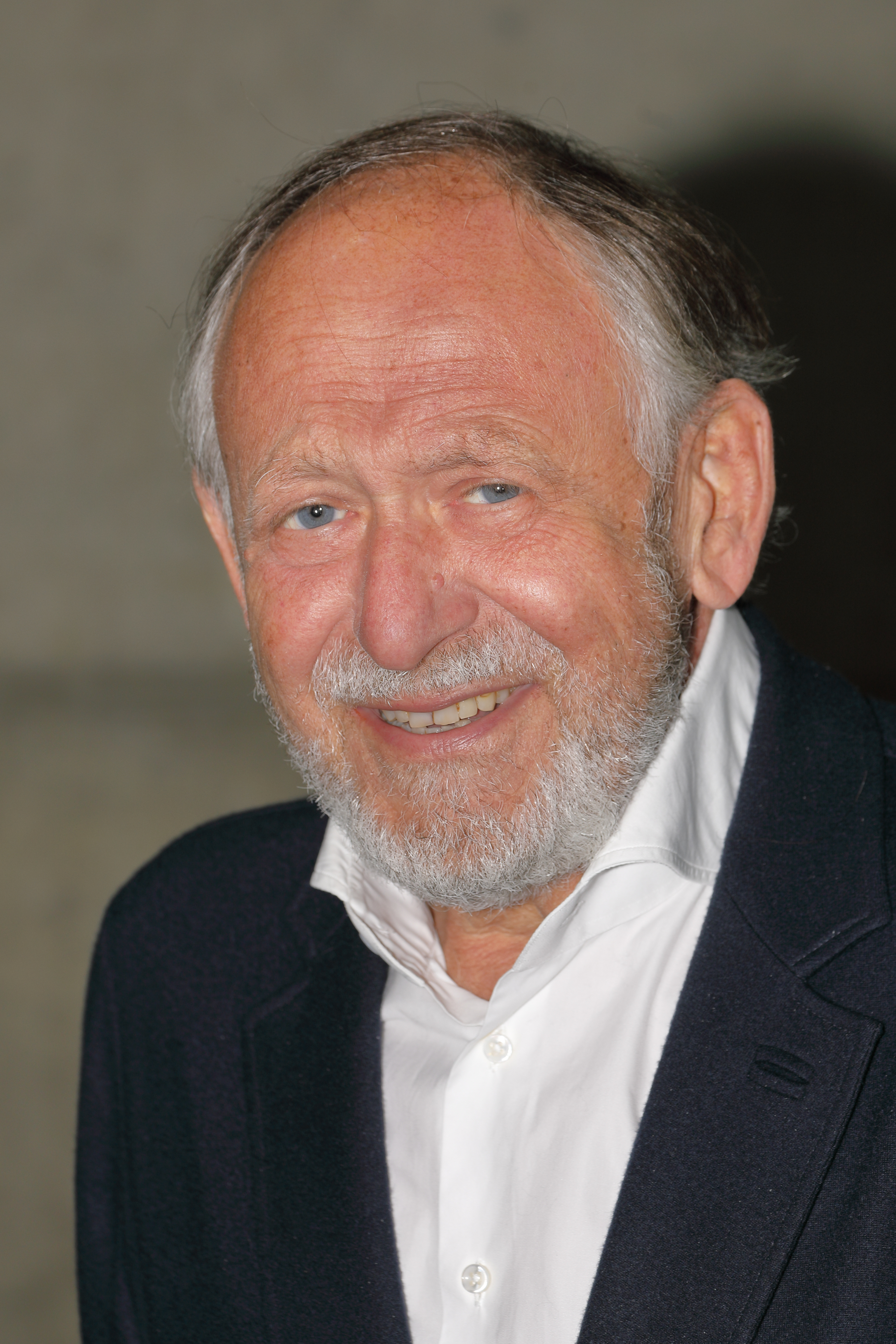
Christoph Zielinski

Christoph Zielinski (born 20 May 1952 in Wieliczka, near Kraków, Poland) is an Austrian physician and cancer researcher. Zielinski is Director of the Clinical Division of Oncology and Chairman of the Department of Medicine I and the Comprehensive Cancer Centre at the Medical University of Vienna. He is also a medical oncologist.

== Early life and education ==
Zielinski is the son of the writer Adam Zielinski and his wife Sophie. In 1957 he came to Vienna with his parents where he finished schooling in 1970. He studied medicine at Medical University of Vienna and received his MD degree in 1976.

== Career ==
Apart from two years as a fellow at the Cancer Research Center at Tufts University, his career has been spent at Medical University of Vienna. He became Professor of Medical Experimental Oncology in 1992, Chairman of the Clinical Division of Oncology in 2002 and Director of the Department of Medicine I in 2004. Outside his work in Vienna, Zielinski was named President of the Central European Cooperative Oncology Group since 1999 and became a member of the executive board of the European Society for Medical Oncology (ESMO) in 2014.

=== Contributions to medical knowledge ===
Zielinski's research focuses on clinical trials in breast and lung cancer as well as personalised medicine and immuno-oncology. Christoph Zielinski is President of the Central European Cooperative Oncology Group (CECOG). As of late 2018 he had published more than 600 original publications and reviews. His h-index exceeds 60.

=== Work as editor ===
ESMO announced in September 2015 that Zielinski would be Editor-in-Chief of ESMO Open, the Society's new peer-reviewed, open-access, online-only journal which is currently in the third year of its existence, is listed in PubMed and has experienced more than 720,000 downloads of published papers.

== Awards ==
- 2003: Anton-Gindely Prize, recognising Zielinski's work as President of the Central European Cooperative Oncology Group
- 2003: City of Vienna Prize for Medical Sciences
- 2013: Honorary degree by Titu Maiorescu University in Bucharest
- 2014: Grand Decoration of Honour in Silver for Services to the Republic of Austria
- 2018: Golden Decoration in Recognition for Services to the City of Vienna
