= Irrigated Rice Research Consortium =

Filipino research consortium

- Abbreviation: IRRC
- Formation: 1997
- Purpose: Natural resource management
- Headquarters: Los Baños, Laguna
- Location: Philippines
- Region served: Asia
- Unit Coordinator: Dr. Grant R. Singleton
- Parent organization: International Rice Research Institute
- Website: www.irri.org/irrc

The Irrigated Rice Research Consortium (IRRC) focuses on agricultural research and extension in irrigated rice-based ecosystems. In partnership with national agricultural research and extension systems (NARES) and the private sector, the IRRC provides a platform for the dissemination and adoption of natural resource management (NRM) technologies in Asian countries. The IRRC is currently active in 11 countries: Bangladesh, Cambodia, China, India, Indonesia, Laos, Myanmar, the Philippines, Sri Lanka, Thailand, and Vietnam. It aims to strengthen NARES-driven interdisciplinary research, link research and extension, facilitate rice farmers' uptake of technological innovations, and enable environmentally sound rice production to expand to feed growing populations.

The consortium was established to identify and address regional research needs in irrigated rice, and to foster multi-disciplinary research. In recent years the emphasis has widened to help strengthen and develop the delivery of appropriate NRM rice technologies in Asia.

== History ==
The IRRC was established in 1997 with support from the Swiss Agency for Development and Cooperation (SDC). It has provided a framework for partnership between the International Rice Research Institute (IRRI), NARES, non-governmental organizations (NGOs), and the private sector in 10 Asian countries.

During its Phase I (1997 to 2000), the IRRC started with three main projects:

1. Integrated Pest Management Network (IPMNet),
2. the Reversing Trends in Declining Productivity (RTDP) Project, and
3. linkage with the Integrated Nutrient Management Network (INMNet).

In 1998, the Hybrid Rice Network (HRNet) became a member of the IRRC.

The IPMNet in collaboration with University of Queensland, developed a Rice IPM CD, and established networks on weed and rodent management. Upon completion of the IRRC Phase I, IPMNet and INMNet was terminated.

The RTDP project developed principles for site-specific nutrient management (SSNM). A field handbook on Rice: Nutritional Disorders and Nutrient Management was published.

In its Phase II (2001 to 2004), the IRRC aimed at addressing regional research needs in irrigated rice, research collaboration, integrating research, leveraging researchers from consortium members, and facilitating technology delivery.

The IRRC in Phase II consisted of a coordination unit, work groups composed of interdisciplinary research and extension teams, and an initiative to include extension systems as a pathway to link research outputs to national programs. These work groups were divided into two general groups: (1) problem-based work groups and (2) a work group on impact. The latter assisted the problem-based work groups in facilitating and documenting technology delivery.

The initial work groups in Phase II were:

RTOP – Reaching Toward Optimal Productivity in Intensive Rice Systems
HRice – Hybrid rice
Weeds – Weed management
Water – Water savings
Rodent – Rodent management
Impact – Impact: Technology Communication, Dissemination and Evaluation

A work group on postharvest technologies was established in 2004.

The IRRC Phase III took place from 2005 to 2008. Phase III included four main work groups to address the Millennium Development Goals. These work groups were formed based on the problems identified by farmers for rice production within irrigated rice ecosystems, which later became research priorities that the work groups dealt with.

A coordination unit was formed to improve rice production and provide the work groups with skills in social sciences and development communication.

In 2006, the IRRC launched the IRRC Country Outreach Program (ICOP). Though led by the NARES partners, the project went beyond the NARES level and made partnerships with local governments, policymakers, extension workers, farmers, the private sector, NGOs, and donor agencies.

In Phase IV (2008 to 2012), the IRRC furthered its research extension partnerships to better address natural resource needs for farmers, formulate solutions, and aid in technology adoption. Currently operating with six work groups and with a stronger focus on food security and reducing poverty, the IRRC intends to increase rice production and foster innovative research on natural resource management of irrigated rice-based cropping systems.

== Organization and structure ==
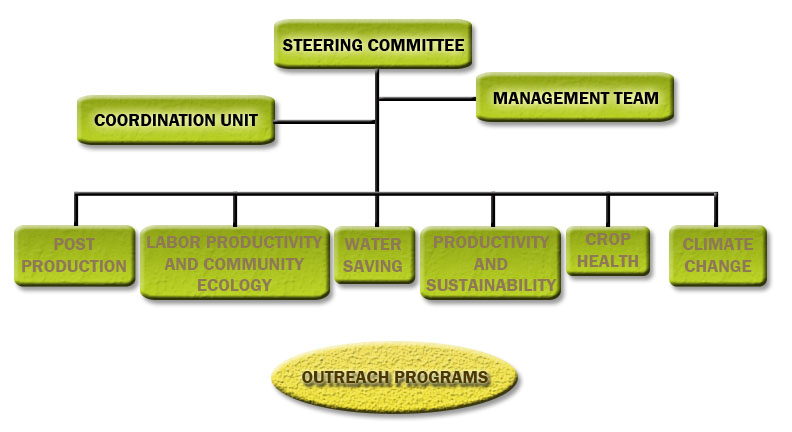
IRRC's Organizational Structure

The Phase IV of the IRRC was initially established with five work groups. A sixth work group on climate change was added in 2011. The work groups are:

- The Productivity and Sustainability WG focuses on improved nutrient and crop management practices at the field and farm level for increased profitability in rice farming. The PSWG helped develop and refine the scientific principles of site-specific nutrient management (SSNM) and the nutrient management decision tools for farmers and agricultural extension workers.
- The Water-Saving WG strives for increased productivity under water-scarce conditions.
- The Labor Productivity and Community Ecology WG works on improving labor productivity, including effective community action for managing weeds and rodents.
- The Postproduction WG takes on improving post-production techniques and access of farmers to market information on rice.
- The Crop Health WG focuses on crop production management (e.g., crop rotation and fallow management) and host-plant resistance for managing insect pests and diseases.
- The Climate Change WG focuses on developing approaches and assisting farmers in mitigating greenhouse gas emissions and adaptation to climate change and more severe climate extremes.

== Outreach programs and impacts ==
It is important for IRRC Phase IV to strengthen research and extension partnerships for technology development, validation, and promotion. In so doing, their programs are geared towards capacity-building of NARES partners, improving approaches and technologies for more productive and ecologically sustainable production of irrigated rice, and disseminating production principles and technologies.

=== Country outreach programs ===
IRRC staff work with in-country partners to

1. exchange information on technological developments,
2. experimentally validate technologies,
3. facilitate information exchange between research and extension, and
4. integrate crop management principles and technologies.

The IRRC assists in scaling out the principles and technologies by

1. providing logistical support to in-country “champions”,
2. providing technical advice,
3. assisting with developing support resources for local extension experts, and
4. conducting collaborative sociological studies on the factors that influence adoption by farmers.

== Donors and partners ==
The donors not only support the Consortium financially, they also provide technical expertise and participate in exchanging ideas and developing approaches to solveproductivity and sustainability problems in irrigated rice.

The Swiss Agency for Development and Cooperation (SDC) provides the majority of the financial resources of the IRRC.

Other donors include international organizations such as

- International Fertilizer Industry Association (IFA). IFA is a nonprofit association representing the global fertilizer industry on matters about plant nutrient promotion, improvement of the operating environment of the member companies, and the collection and compilation of industry information.
- International Plant Nutrition Institute (IPNI). IPNI is a nonprofit and science-based organization that was established in January 2007. It provides the nutrition benefits from plants for the human family.
- The International Potash Institute] (IPI). IPI is a nongovernment and nonprofit organization that was established in 1952. It is supported by producers in Europe and the Near East. It aims to

1. contribute to the maintenance of soil fertility and the production of nutritious food by conducting related applied research and educational programs,
2. disseminate and transfer the knowledge on the effects of potassium (K) in soils and its impact on yield, quality, and stress tolerance in plants, and
3. collect, analyze, and share the results and information on the effects of balanced fertilization to optimize the use of plant nutrition.

- Australian Centre for International Agricultural Development (ACIAR). ACIAR is an Australian Government Statutory Authority that was established in 1982. It aims to enhance rural household incomes and broader economic growth by investing in international research partnerships that encourage agricultural development, sustainable use of natural resources, and capacity-building of benefit to partner countries and Australia.
- Research Into Use; Innovation Challenge Fund led by the NGO NEFORD (DFID, UK). RIU is a program under the Department for International Development (DFID) in the UK. It aims to get new technologies to poor farmers, and help governments to make better policies.
- Asian Development Bank (ADB). ADB is regional development bank that was established in August 1966. It aims to facilitate economic development in Asian countries.
- Challenge Program for Water and Food (CPWF). CPWF is a program of the Consultative Group on International Agricultural Research (CGIAR) that started in 2002. It aims to increase the resilience of social and ecological systems through better water management for food production (crops, fisheries, and livestock).
