= Immune-related response criteria =

The immune-related response criteria (irRC) is a set of published rules that define when tumors in cancer patients improve ("respond"), stay the same ("stabilize"), or worsen ("progress") during treatment, where the compound being evaluated is an immuno-oncology drug. Immuno-oncology, part of the broader field of cancer immunotherapy, involves agents which harness the body's own immune system to fight cancer. Traditionally, patient responses to new cancer treatments have been evaluated using two sets of criteria, the WHO criteria and the response evaluation criteria in solid tumors (RECIST). The immune-related response criteria, first published in 2009, arose out of observations that immuno-oncology drugs would fail in clinical trials that measured responses using the WHO or RECIST Criteria, because these criteria could not account for the time gap in many patients between initial treatment and the apparent action of the immune system to reduce the tumor burden.

== Background ==
Part of the process of determining the effectiveness of anti-cancer agents in clinical trials involves measuring the amount of tumor shrinkage such agents can generate. The WHO Criteria, developed in the 1970s by the International Union Against Cancer and the World Health Organization, represented the first generally agreed specific criteria for the codification of tumor response evaluation. These criteria were first published in 1981. The RECIST criteria, first published in 2000, revised the WHO criteria primarily to clarify differences that remained between research groups. Under RECIST tumour size was measured unidimensionally rather than bidimensionally, fewer lesions were measured, and the definition of 'progression' was changed so that it was no longer based on the isolated increase of a single lesion. RECIST also adopted a different shrinkage threshold for definitions of tumour response and progression. For the WHO Criteria it had been >50% tumour shrinkage for a Partial Response and >25% tumour increase for Progressive Disease. For RECIST it was >30% shrinkage for a Partial Response and >20% increase for Progressive Disease. One outcome of all these revisions was that more patients who would have been considered 'progressors' under the old criteria became 'responders' or 'stable' under the new criteria. RECIST and its successor, RECIST 1.1 from 2009, is now the standard measurement protocol for measuring response in cancer trials.

The key driver in the development of the irRC was the observation that, in studies of various cancer therapies derived from the immune system such as cytokines and monoclonal antibodies, the looked-for Complete and Partial Responses as well as Stable Disease only occurred after an increase in tumor burden that the conventional RECIST Criteria would have dubbed 'Progressive Disease'. Basically, RECIST failed to take account of the delay between dosing and an observed anti-tumour T cell response, so that otherwise 'successful' drugs - that is, drugs which ultimately prolonged life - failed in clinical trials. This led various researchers and drug developers interested in cancer immunotherapy such as Axel Hoos at Bristol-Myers Squibb (BMS) to start discussing whether a new set of response criteria ought to be developed specifically for immmuno-oncology drugs. Their ideas, first flagged in a key 2007 paper in the Journal of Immunotherapy, evolved into the immune-related response criteria (irRC), which was published in late 2009 in the journal Clinical Cancer Research.

== The criteria ==
The developers of the irRC based their criteria on the WHO Criteria but modified it:

- Measurement of tumour burden. In the irRC, tumour burden is measured by combining 'index' lesions with new lesions. Ordinarily tumour burden would be measured simply with a limited number of 'index' lesions (that is, the largest identifiable lesions) at baseline, with new lesions identified at subsequent timepoints counting as 'Progressive Disease'. In the irRC, by contrast, new lesions are simply a change in tumour burden. The irRC retained the bidirectional measurement of lesions that had originally been laid down in the WHO Criteria.
- Assessment of immune-related response. In the irRC, an immune-related Complete Response (irCR) is the disappearance of all lesions, measured or unmeasured, and no new lesions; an immune-related Partial Response (irPR) is a 50% drop in tumour burden from baseline as defined by the irRC; and immune-related Progressive Disease (irPD) is a 25% increase in tumour burden from the lowest level recorded. Everything else is considered immune-related Stable Disease (irSD). The thinking here is that even if tumour burden is rising, the immune system is likely to 'kick in' some months after first dosing and lead to an eventual decline in tumour burden for many patients. The 25% threshold allows this apparent delay to be accounted for.

== Evidence of usefulness ==
The initial evidence cited by the creators of the irRC that their criteria were useful lay in the two Phase II melanoma trials described in the Clinical Cancer Research paper. The drug being trialled was a monoclonal antibody called ipilimumab, then under development at BMS with Axel Hoos as the medical lead. The drug targeted an immune checkpoint called CTLA-4, known as a key negative regulator of T cell activity. By blocking CTLA-4, ipilimumab was designed to potentiate antitumor T-cell responses. In the Phase IIs, which encompassed 227 treated patients and evaluated patients using the irRC, around 10% of these patients would have been deemed to have Progressive Disease by the WHO Criteria but actually experienced irPRs or irSDs, consistent with a response to ipilimumab.

The Phase III clinical failure of Pfizer's tremelimumab anti-CTLA-4 monoclonal antibody, which competed with ipilimumab, provided the first large-scale evidence of the utility of the irRC. The Pfizer study used conventional response criteria, and an early interim analysis found no survival advantage for the treated patients, leading to the termination of the trial in April 2008. However within a year of this development, Pfizer's investigators were beginning to notice a separation of survival curves between treatment and control groups. Tremelimumab's competitor, ipilimumab, which was trialled in Phase III using the irRC, went on to gain FDA approval in 2011, indicated for unresectable stage III or IV melanoma, after a 676-patient study that compared ipilimumab plus an experimental vaccine called gp100 with the vaccine alone. The median overall survival for the ipilimumab+vaccine group was 10 months versus only 6.4 months for the vaccine. Marketed as Yervoy, ipilimumab subsequently became a blockbuster for BMS.

== Key people ==
The 2009 paper which described the new irRC had twelve authors, all associated with the ipilimumab clinical trials used as examples - Jedd Wolchok of Memorial Sloan Kettering Cancer Center, Axel Hoos and Rachel Humphrey of Bristol-Myers Squibb, Steven O'Day and Omid Hamid of the Angeles Clinic in Santa Monica, Ca., Jeffrey Weber of the University of South Florida, Celeste Lebbé of Hôpital Saint-Louis in Paris, Michele Maio of University Hospital of Siena, Michael Binder of Medical University of Vienna, Oliver Bohnsack of a Berlin-based clinical informatics firm called Perceptive Informatics, Geoffrey Nichol of the antibody engineering company Medarex (which had originally developed ipilimumab) and Stephen Hodi of the Dana–Farber Cancer Institute in Boston.
