= C639H1006N168O196S8 =

The molecular formula C_{639}H_{1006}N_{168}O_{196}S_{8} (molar mass: 14434.353 g/mol) may refer to:

- Granulocyte-macrophage colony-stimulating factor
- Sargramostim
