= Talimogene laherparepvec =

Gene therapy medication

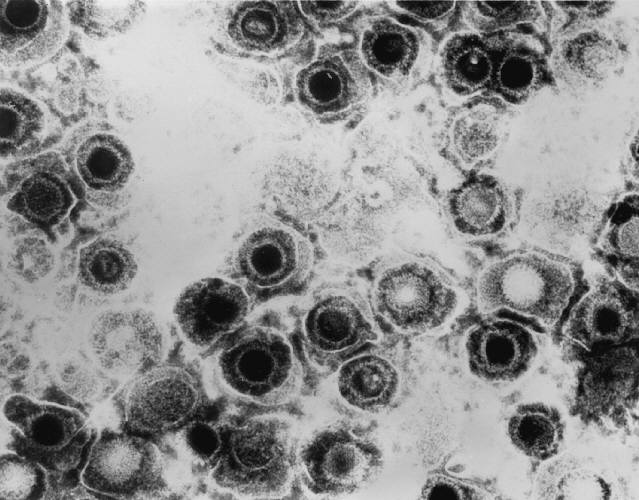
- Transmission electron micrograph of an unmodified herpes simplex virus

Gene therapy
- Target gene: GM-CSF
- Vector: Herpes simplex virus 1

Clinical data
- Pronunciation: /təˈlɪmoʊdʒiːn ləˌhɛrpəˈrɛpvɛk/ tə-LIM-oh-jeen lə-HER-pə-REP-vek
- Trade names: Imlygic, Oncovex
- Other names: T-VEC
- AHFS/Drugs.com: Monograph
- MedlinePlus: a616006
- License data: US DailyMed: Talimogene laherparepvec
- Pregnancy category: Contraindicated
- Routes of administration: Injection
- ATC code: L01XL02 (WHO)

Legal status
- Legal status: AU: S4 (Prescription only); US: ℞-only; EU: Rx-only; In general: ℞ (Prescription only)

Identifiers
- CAS Number: 1187560-31-1
- DrugBank: DB13896
- ChemSpider: none
- UNII: 07730V90L6
- KEGG: D09966

Talimogene laherparepvec (T-VEC), sold under the brand name Imlygic among others, is a biopharmaceutical medication used to treat melanoma that cannot be operated on; it is injected directly into a subset of lesions which generates a systemic immune response against the recipient's cancer. The final four-year analysis from the pivotal phase 3 study upon which T-VEC was approved by the FDA showed a 31.5% response rate with a 16.9% complete response (CR) rate. There was also a substantial and statistically significant survival benefit in patients with earlier metastatic disease (stages IIIb-IVM1a) and in patients who had not received prior systemic treatment for melanoma. The earlier stage group had a reduction in the risk of death of approximately 50% with one in four patients appearing to have met, or be close to be reaching, the medical definition of cure. Real world use of talimogene laherparepvec have shown response rates of up to 88.5% with CR rates of up to 61.5%.

Around half of people treated with talimogene laherparepvec in clinical trials experienced fatigue and chills; around 40% had fever, around 35% had nausea, and around 30% had flu-like symptoms as well as pain at the injection site. The reactions were mild to moderate in severity; 2% of people had severe reactions and these were generally cellulitis.

Talimogene laherparepvec is a genetically engineered herpes virus (an oncolytic herpes virus). Two genes were removed – one that shuts down an individual cell's defenses, and another that helps the virus evade the immune system – and a gene for human GM-CSF was added. The drug works by replicating in cancer cells, causing them to burst; it was also designed to stimulate an immune response against the patient's cancer, which has been demonstrated by multiple pieces of data, including regression of tumors which have not been injected with talimogene laherparepvec.

The drug was created and initially developed by BioVex, Inc. and was continued by Amgen, which acquired BioVex in 2011. It was one of the first oncolytic immunotherapy approved globally; it was approved in the US in October 2015 and approved in Europe in December 2015.

== Medical uses ==
Talimogene laherparepvec is delivered by injecting it directly into tumors, thereby creating a systemic anti-tumor immune response.

In the US, talimogene laherparepvec is FDA approved to treat Stage IIIb-IVM1c melanoma patients for whom surgical intervention is not appropriate and with tumors which can be directly injected; the EMA approved population in Europe is for Stage IIIb-IVM1a.

Talimogene laherparepvec has been shown to extend survival in patients with Stage IIIb-IVM1a melanoma and patients who have not received prior systemic therapy for melanoma.

== Adverse effects ==
Around half of people treated with talimogene laherparepvec in clinical trials experienced fatigue and chills; around 40% had fever, around 35% had nausea, and around 30% had flu-like symptoms as well as pain at the injection site. The reactions were mild to moderate in severity; 2% of people had severe reactions and these were generally cellulitis.

More than 10% of people had edema, headache, cough, vomiting, diarrhea, constipation, muscle pain, or joint pain. Between 1% and 10% developed cold sores, pain or infection in the lesion, anemia, immune mediated events (like vasculitis, pneumonia, worsening psoriasis, glomerulonephritis and vitiligo), dehydration, confusion, anxiety, depression, dizziness, insomnia, ear pain, fast heart beating, deep vein thrombosis, high blood pressure, flushing, shortness of breath when exercising, sore throat, symptoms of the common cold, stomach pain, back pain, groin pain, weight loss, or oozing from the injection site.

== Pharmacology ==
Talimogene laherparepvec is taken up by normal cells and cancer cells like the wild type herpes simplex virus, it is cleared in the same way.

== Mechanism ==
Talimogene laherparepvec directly destroys the cancer cells it infects, inducing a systemic immune response against the cancer.

The virus invades both cancerous and healthy cells, but it cannot productively replicate in healthy tissue because it lacks infected cell protein 34.5 (ICP34.5). When cells are infected with a virus they shut down and die, but ICP34.5 blocks this stress response, allowing the virus to hijack the cell's translation machinery to replicate itself. A herpesvirus lacking the gene coding for ICP34.5 cannot replicate in normal tissue. However, in many cancer cells the stress response is already disrupted, so a virus lacking ICP34.5 can still replicate in tumors. After the virus has replicated many times, the cell swells and finally bursts, killing the cell and releasing the copies of the virus, which can then infect nearby cells.

While talimogene laherparepvec is using the cell's translation machinery to replicate, it also uses it to make the cell create GM-CSF. GM-CSF is secreted or released when the cancer cell bursts, attracting dendritic cells to the site, which pick up the tumor antigens, process them, and then present them on their surface to cytotoxic (killer) T cells which in turn sets off an immune response.

== Composition ==
Talimogene laherparepvec is a biopharmaceutical drug; it is an oncolytic herpes virus that was created by genetically engineering a strain of herpes simplex virus 1 (HSV-1) taken from a person infected with the virus, rather than a laboratory strain. Both copies of the viral gene coding for ICP34.5 were deleted and replaced with the gene coding for human GM-CSF, and the gene coding for ICP47 was removed. In wild herpes virus, ICP47 suppresses the immune response to the virus; it was removed because the drug was designed with the intention of activating the immune system.

== History ==
The first oncolytic virus to be approved by a regulatory agency was a genetically modified adenovirus named H101 by Shanghai Sunway Biotech. It gained regulatory approval in 2005 from China's State Food and Drug Administration (SFDA) for the treatment of head and neck cancer. Talimogene laherparepvec is the world's first approved oncolytic immunotherapy, i.e. it was also designed to provide systemic anti-tumor effects through the induction of an anti-tumor immune response.

Talimogene laherparepvec was created and initially developed by BioVex, Inc. under the brand OncoVEX^{GM-CSF}. Development was continued by Amgen, which acquired BioVex in 2011. BioVex was founded in 1999, based on research by Robert Coffin at University College London, and moved its headquarters to Woburn, Massachusetts in 2005, leaving about half its employees in the UK.

The phase II clinical trial in melanoma was published in 2009 and the phase III trial was published in 2013.

Talimogene laherparepvec was approved by the US Food and Drug Administration to treat melanoma in October 2015. It was the first approval of an oncolytic virus and the first approval of a gene therapy in the West. It was approved by the European Medicines Agency in December of that year.

== Society and culture ==
=== Economics ===
Amgen estimated that talimogene laherparepvec would be priced at US$65,000 per patient at the time it was approved.
