= Oncolytic virus =

Type of virus

An oncolytic virus is a virus that preferentially infects and kills cancer cells. As the infected cancer cells are destroyed by oncolysis, they release new infectious virus particles or virions that help destroy the remaining tumour. Oncolytic viruses are thought not only to cause direct destruction of the tumour cells, but also to stimulate host anti-tumour immune system responses. Oncolytic viruses also have the ability to affect the tumor micro-environment in multiple ways.

The potential of viruses as anti-cancer agents was first realised in the early twentieth century, although coordinated research efforts did not begin until the 1960s. A number of viruses including adenovirus, reovirus, measles, herpes simplex, Newcastle disease virus, and vaccinia have been clinically tested as oncolytic agents. Most current oncolytic viruses are engineered for tumour selectivity, though naturally occurring oncolytic viruses such as reovirus and senecavirus, have undergone clinical trials.

The first oncolytic virus to be approved by a national regulatory agency was genetically unmodified ECHO-7 strain enterovirus RIGVIR, which was approved in Latvia in 2004 for the treatment of skin melanoma; the approval was withdrawn in 2019. An oncolytic adenovirus, a genetically modified adenovirus named H101, was approved in China in 2005 for the treatment of head and neck cancer. In 2015, talimogene laherparepvec (aka T-VEC), an oncolytic herpes virus which is a modified herpes simplex virus, became the first oncolytic virus to be approved for use in the United States and the European Union, for the treatment of advanced inoperable melanoma.

On 16 December 2022, the Food and Drug Administration approved nadofaragene firadenovec-vncg (Adstiladrin, Ferring Pharmaceuticals) for adult patients with high-risk Bacillus Calmette-Guérin (BCG) unresponsive non-muscle invasive bladder cancer (NMIBC) with carcinoma in situ (CIS) with or without papillary tumors.

== History ==
A connection between cancer regression and viruses has long been theorised, and case reports of regression noted in cervical cancer, Burkitt lymphoma, and Hodgkin lymphoma, after immunisation or infection with an unrelated virus appeared at the beginning of the 20th century. Efforts to treat cancer through immunisation or virotherapy (deliberate infection with a virus), began in the mid-20th century. As the technology to create a custom virus did not exist, all early efforts focused on finding natural oncolytic viruses. During the 1960s, promising research involved using poliovirus, adenovirus, coxsackie virus, ECHO enterovirus RIGVIR, and others. The early complications were occasional cases of uncontrolled infection (resulting in significant morbidity and mortality); an immune response would also frequently develop. While not directly harmful to the patient, the response destroyed the virus thus preventing it from destroying the cancer. Early efforts also found that only certain cancers could be treated through virotherapy. Even when a response was seen, these responses were neither complete nor durable. The field of virotherapy was nearly abandoned for a time, as the technology required to modify viruses did not exist whereas chemotherapy and radiotherapy technology enjoyed early success. However, now that these technologies have been thoroughly developed and cancer remains a major cause of mortality, there is still a need for novel cancer therapies, garnering this once-sidelined therapy renewed interest. In one case report published in 2024, a scientist Beata Halassy treated her own stage 3 breast cancer using an Edmonston-Zagreb measles vaccine strain (MeV) and then a vesicular stomatitis virus Indiana strain (VSV), both prepared in her own laboratory, in combination with trastuzumab. While the treatment was successful and self-experimentation has a long history in science, the decision to publish the case report attracted controversy due to the unapproved nature of the viral agents and treatment protocol used.

=== Herpes simplex virus ===
Herpes simplex virus (HSV) was one of the first viruses to be adapted to attack cancer cells selectively, because it was well understood, easy to manipulate and relatively harmless in its natural state (merely causing cold sores) so likely to pose fewer risks. The herpes simplex virus type 1 (HSV-1) mutant 1716 lacks both copies of the ICP34.5 gene, and as a result is no longer able to replicate in terminally differentiated and non-dividing cells but will infect and cause lysis very efficiently in cancer cells, and this has proved to be an effective tumour-targeting strategy. In a wide range of in vivo cancer models, the HSV1716 virus has induced tumour regression and increased survival times.

In 1996, the first approval was given in Europe for a clinical trial using the oncolytic virus HSV1716. From 1997 to 2003, strain HSV1716 was injected into tumours of patients with glioblastoma multiforme, a highly malignant brain tumour, with no evidence of toxicity or side effects, and some long-term survivors. Other safety trials have used HSV1716 to treat patients with melanoma and squamous-cell carcinoma of head and neck. Since then other studies have shown that the outer coating of HSV1716 variants can be targeted to specific types of cancer cells, and can be used to deliver a variety of additional genes into cancer cells, such as genes to split a harmless prodrug inside cancer cells to release toxic chemotherapy, or genes which command infected cancer cells to concentrate protein tagged with radioactive iodine, so that individual cancer cells are killed by micro-dose radiation as well as by virus-induced cell lysis.

Other oncolytic viruses based on HSV have also been developed and are in clinical trials. One that has been approved by the FDA for advanced melanoma is Amgen's talimogene laherparepvec.

=== Oncorine (H101) ===
The first oncolytic virus to be approved by a regulatory agency was a genetically modified adenovirus named H101 by Shanghai Sunway Biotech. It gained regulatory approval in 2005 from China's State Food and Drug Administration (SFDA) for the treatment of head and neck cancer. Sunway's H101 and the very similar Onyx-15 (dl1520) have been engineered to remove a viral defense mechanism that interacts with a normal human gene p53, which is very frequently dysregulated in cancer cells. Despite the promises of early in vivo lab work, these viruses do not specifically infect cancer cells, but they still kill cancer cells preferentially. While overall survival rates are not known, short-term response rates are approximately doubled for H101 plus chemotherapy when compared to chemotherapy alone. It appears to work best when injected directly into a tumour, and when any resulting fever is not suppressed. Systemic therapy (such as through infusion through an intravenous line) is desirable for treating metastatic disease. It is now marketed under the brand name Oncorine.

== Mechanisms of action ==
=== Immunotherapy ===
With advances in cancer immunotherapy such as immune checkpoint inhibitors, increased attention has been given to using oncolytic viruses to increase antitumor immunity. There are two main considerations of the interaction between oncolytic viruses and the immune system.

==== Immunity as an obstacle ====
A major obstacle to the success of oncolytic viruses is the patient immune system which naturally attempts to deactivate any virus. This can be a particular problem for intravenous injection, where the virus must first survive interactions with the blood complement and neutralising antibodies. It has been shown that immunosuppression by chemotherapy and inhibition of the complement system can enhance oncolytic virus therapy.

Pre-existing immunity can be partly avoided by using viruses that are not common human pathogens. However, this does not avoid subsequent antibody generation. Yet, some studies have shown that pre-immunity to oncolytic viruses doesn't cause a significant reduction in efficacy.

Alternatively, the viral vector can be coated with a polymer such as polyethylene glycol, shielding it from antibodies, but this also prevents viral coat proteins adhering to host cells.

Another way to help oncolytic viruses reach cancer growths after intravenous injection, is to hide them inside macrophages (a type of white blood cell). Macrophages automatically migrate to areas of tissue destruction, especially where oxygen levels are low, characteristic of cancer growths, and have been used successfully to deliver oncolytic viruses to prostate cancer in animals.

==== Immunity as an ally ====
Although it poses a hurdle by inactivating viruses, the patient's immune system can also act as an ally against tumors; infection attracts the attention of the immune system to the tumour and may help to generate useful and long-lasting antitumor immunity. One important mechanism is the release of substances by tumor lysis, such as tumor-associated antigens and danger associated-molecular patterns (DAMPs), which can elicit an antitumor immune response. This essentially produces a personalised cancer vaccine.

Many cases of spontaneous remission of cancer have been recorded. Though the cause is not fully understood, they are thought likely to be a result of a sudden immune response or infection. Efforts to induce this phenomenon have used cancer vaccines (derived from cancer cells or selected cancer antigens), or direct treatment with immune-stimulating factors on skin cancers. Some oncolytic viruses are very immunogenic and may by infection of the tumour elicit an anti-tumor immune response, especially viruses delivering cytokines or other immune stimulating factors.

Viruses selectively infect tumor cells because of their defective anti-viral response. Imlygic, an attenuated herpes simplex virus, has been genetically engineered to replicate preferentially within tumor cells and to generate antigens that elicit an immune response.

== Oncolytic behaviour of wild-type viruses ==
The following table summarizes some key wild-type viruses with reported oncolytic properties

Some naturally occurring viruses investigated for oncolytic activity
Virus	Virus family	Natural host	Clinical investigation
Reovirus (e.g., Reolysin/pelareorep formulation)	Reoviridae	Humans (respiratory/enteral, often asymptomatic)	Multiple clinical trials (phase I–III), primarily in combination therapies
Senecavirus A (Seneca Valley Virus, e.g., NTX-010/SVV-001)	Picornaviridae	Swine (originally detected in pigs; incidental in humans)	Phase I/II clinical trials (e.g., neuroendocrine tumors, small cell lung cancer, pediatric solids)
Echovirus 7 (RIGVIR/ECHO-7 Rigvir)	Picornaviridae	Humans	The potential use of echovirus as an oncolytic virus to treat cancer was discovered by Latvian scientist Aina Muceniece in the 1960s and 1970s. A 2015 retrospective study of 79 patients reported that Rigvir treatment after surgical excision was associated with prolonged survival in stage IB–IIC melanoma compared to observation alone Former registration/approval in Latvia was given in 2004 and was withdrawn in 2019 due to low viral titer, and invalid testing methods; limited use in some countries; evidence considered insufficient for broader approval.
Newcastle disease virus	Paramyxoviridae	Birds (avian)	Multiple clinical trials (phase I/II), including intravenous delivery
Sendai virus (Murine respirovirus)	Paramyxoviridae	Rodents (mice/rats)	Preclinical studies; limited historical/experimental human use. Clinical studies of UV inactivated variant for prostate cancer and melanoma
Vesicular stomatitis virus	Rhabdoviridae	Livestock/insects	Preclinical; some attenuated variants in trials mainly genetically modified
Coxsackievirus A21 (Cavatak)	Picornaviridae	Humans	Clinical trials (phase I/II) for treating melanoma, non-muscle-invasive bladder cancer, and various other solid tumors.

=== Vaccinia virus ===
Vaccinia virus (VACV) is arguably the most successful live biotherapeutic agent because of its critical role in the eradication of smallpox, one of the most deadly diseases in human history. Long before the smallpox eradication campaign was launched, VACV was exploited as a therapeutic agent for the treatment of cancer. In 1922, Levaditi and Nicolau reported that VACV was able to inhibit the growth of various tumors in mice and rats. This was the first demonstration of viral oncolysis in the laboratory. This virus was subsequently shown to selectively infect and destroy tumor cells with great potency, while sparing normal cells, both in cell cultures and in animal models. Since vaccinia virus has long been recognized as an ideal backbone for vaccines due to its potent antigen presentation capability, this combines well with its natural oncolytic activities as an oncolytic virus for cancer immunotherapy.

=== Vesicular stomatitis virus ===
Vesicular stomatitis virus (VSV) is a rhabdovirus, consisting of 5 genes encoded by a negative sense, single-stranded RNA genome. In nature, VSV infects insects as well as livestock, where it causes a relatively localized and non-fatal illness. The low pathogenicity of this virus is due in large part to its sensitivity to interferons, a class of proteins that are released into the tissues and bloodstream during infection. These molecules activate genetic anti-viral defence programs that protect cells from infection and prevent spread of the virus. However, in 2000, Stojdl, Lichty et al. demonstrated that defects in these pathways render cancer cells unresponsive to the protective effects of interferons and therefore highly sensitive to infection with VSV. Since VSV undergoes a rapid cytolytic replication cycle, infection leads to death of the malignant cell and roughly a 1000-fold amplification of virus within 24h. VSV is therefore highly suitable for therapeutic application, and several groups have gone on to show that systemically administered VSV can be delivered to a tumour site, where it replicates and induces disease regression, often leading to durable cures. Attenuation of the virus by engineering a deletion of Met-51 of the matrix protein ablates virtually all infection of normal tissues, while replication in tumour cells is unaffected.

Recent research has shown that this virus has the potential to cure brain tumours, thanks to its oncolytic properties.

=== Poliovirus ===
Poliovirus is a natural invasive neurotropic virus, making it the obvious choice for selective replication in tumours derived from neuronal cells. Poliovirus has a plus-strand RNA genome, the translation of which depends on a tissue-specific internal ribosome entry site (IRES) within the 5' untranslated region of the viral genome, which is active in cells of neuronal origin and allows translation of the viral genome without a 5' cap. Gromeier et al. (2000) replaced the normal poliovirus IRES with a rhinovirus IRES, altering tissue specificity. The resulting PV1(RIPO) virus was able to selectively destroy malignant glioma cells, while leaving normal neuronal cells untouched.

=== Reovirus ===
Reoviruses generally infect mammalian respiratory and bowel systems (the name deriving from an acronym, respiratory enteric orphan virus). Most people have been exposed to reovirus by adulthood; however, the infection does not typically produce symptoms. The reovirus' oncolytic potential was established after they were discovered to reproduce well in various cancer cell lines, lysing these cells.

Reolysin is a formulation of reovirus intended to treat various cancers currently undergoing clinical trials.

=== Senecavirus ===
Senecavirus, also known as Seneca Valley Virus, is a naturally occurring wild-type oncolytic picornavirus discovered in 2001 as a tissue culture contaminate at Genetic Therapy, Inc. The initial isolate, SVV-001, is being developed as an anti-cancer therapeutic by Neotropix, Inc. under the name NTX-010 for cancers with neuroendocrine features including small cell lung cancer and a variety of pediatric solid tumours.

=== RIGVIR ===
RIGVIR is a drug that was approved by the State Agency of Medicines of the Republic of Latvia in 2004. It was also approved in Georgia and Armenia. It is wild type ECHO-7, a member of echovirus group. The potential use of echovirus as an oncolytic virus to treat cancer was discovered by Latvian scientist Aina Muceniece in the 1960s and 1970s. The data used to register the drug in Latvia is not sufficient to obtain approval to use it in the US, Europe, or Japan. As of 2017 there was no good evidence that RIGVIR is an effective cancer treatment. On 19 March 2019, the manufacturer of ECHO-7, SIA LATIMA, announced the drug's removal from sale in Latvia, quoting financial and strategic reasons and insufficient profitability. However, several days later an investigative TV show revealed that State Agency of Medicines had run laboratory tests on the vials, and found that the amount of ECHO-7 virus is of a much smaller amount than claimed by the manufacturer. According to agency's lab director, "It's like buying what you think is lemon juice, but finding that what you have is lemon-flavored water". In March 2019, the distribution of ECHO-7 in Latvia has been stopped. Based on the request of some patients, medical institutions and physicians were allowed to continue use despite the suspension of the registration certificate.

=== Semliki Forest virus ===
Semliki Forest virus (SFV) is a virus that naturally infects cells of the central nervous system and causes encephalitis. A genetically engineered form has been pre-clinically tested as an oncolytic virus against the severe brain tumour type glioblastoma. The SFV was genetically modified with microRNA target sequences so that it only replicated in brain tumour cells and not in normal brain cells. The modified virus reduced tumour growth and prolonged survival of mice with brain tumours. The modified virus was also found to efficiently kill human glioblastoma tumour cell lines.

=== Coxsackievirus A21 ===
Coxsackievirus A21 (CVA21), also known as V937, is one of the most extensively studied oncolytic enteroviruses and belongs to the species Enterovirus C within the family Picornaviridae. The virus targets cells via the cell entry receptors ICAM-1 and CD55 (DAF), making it suitable for tumors that overexpress these molecules, including melanoma, non-muscle-invasive bladder cancer, and various other solid tumors. Clinical trials have tested CVA21 through intratumoral, intravesical and intravenous routes, both as a single agent and together with immune checkpoint inhibitors. Phase I and II studies have demonstrated that the virus replicates inside tumor tissue and triggers antitumor immune responses. In combination treatments, serious side effects were typically linked to the checkpoint inhibitors rather than to the virus.

=== Sendai virus (murine respirovirus) ===
Sendai virus (SeV) is a murine parainfluenza virus type 1 that is a member of the genus Respirovirus in Paramyxoviridae virus family. It naturally infects rodents but does not replicate in human cells under normal conditions. SeV has a negative-sense, single-stranded RNA genome and replicates in the cytoplasm without a DNA phase, reducing the risk of genomic integration. The mouse-specific tropism, combined with its inherent inability to cause disease in humans, makes it a candidate for oncolytic virotherapy (see section murine respirovirus as an oncolytic agent). Studies have demonstrated that certain wild type and genetically modified strains of Sendai virus can selectively replicate in and destroy various human cancer cell lines while showing limited replication in normal human cells. The virus's oncolytic activity has been attributed to defects in interferon responses commonly found in cancer cells. Additionally, SeV infection can induce strong innate and adaptive immune responses, potentially contributing to antitumor immunity beyond direct viral oncolysis. Sendai virus has primarily been investigated in preclinical models like natural dog's cancers and experimental clinical settings, including studies using UV-inactivated viral particles.

=== Other ===
The maraba virus, first identified in Brazilian sandflies, is being tested clinically.

Coxsackievirus A21 is being developed by Viralytics under trade name Cavatak. Coxsackievirus A21 belongs to Enterovirus C species.

Influenza A is one of the earliest viruses anecdotally reported to induce cancer regression. This has prompted preclinical development of genetically engineered oncolytic influenza A viruses.

== Engineering oncolytic viruses ==
=== Directed evolution ===
An innovative approach of drug development termed "directed evolution" involves the creation of new viral variants or serotypes specifically directed against tumour cells via rounds of directed selection using large populations of randomly generated recombinant precursor viruses. The increased biodiversity produced by the initial homologous recombination step provides a large random pool of viral candidates which can then be passed through a series of selection steps designed to lead towards a pre-specified outcome (e.g. higher tumor specific activity) without requiring any previous knowledge of the resultant viral mechanisms that are responsible for that outcome. The pool of resultant oncolytic viruses can then be further screened in pre-clinical models to select an oncolytic virus with the desired therapeutic characteristics.

Directed evolution was applied on human adenovirus, one of many viruses that are being developed as oncolytic agents, to create a highly selective and yet potent oncolytic vaccine. As a result of this process, ColoAd1 (a novel chimeric member of the group B adenoviruses) was generated. This hybrid of adenovirus serotypes Ad11p and Ad3 shows much higher potency and tumour selectivity than the control viruses (including Ad5, Ad11p and Ad3) and was confirmed to generate approximately two logs more viral progeny on freshly isolated human colon tumour tissue than on matching normal tissue.

=== Attenuation ===
Attenuation involves deleting viral genes, or gene regions, to eliminate viral functions that are expendable in tumour cells, but not in normal cells, thus making the virus safer and more tumour-specific. Cancer cells and virus-infected cells have similar alterations in their cell signalling pathways, particularly those that govern progression through the cell cycle. A viral gene whose function is to alter a pathway is dispensable in cells where the pathway is defective, but not in cells where the pathway is active.

The enzymes thymidine kinase and ribonucleotide reductase in cells are responsible for DNA synthesis and are only expressed in cells which are actively replicating. These enzymes also exist in the genomes of certain viruses (e.g. HSV, vaccinia) and allow viral replication in quiescent (non-replicating) cells, so if they are inactivated by mutation the virus will only be able to replicate in proliferating cells, such as cancer cells.

=== Altering tissue tropism and reducing neurovirulence ===
For viruses with inherent neurotropism like poliovirus or broad tissue infectivity, oncolytic development has often focused on modifying viral determinants of tissue tropism in order to restrict replication to malignant cells while reducing the risk of infection of normal tissues, particularly the central nervous system.

One strategy involves altering viral regulatory elements that control translation or replication in specific cell types. For example, replacement of native internal ribosome entry site (IRES) elements with heterologous IRES sequences has been used to change tissue-specific translation efficiency and reduce neurovirulence while preserving replication in tumor cells. This approach has been applied in modified poliovirus-based oncolytic platforms (PVSRIPO), where substitution of the poliovirus IRES with a rhinovirus IRES altered neuronal tropism and attenuated neurotoxicity.

Additional approaches include deletion or modification of viral genes associated with neuroinvasion or replication in differentiated cells, introduction of tumor-selective transcriptional control elements, and incorporation of microRNA target sequences to suppress replication in non-malignant tissues. Together, these strategies aim to enhance tumor selectivity while maintaining biosafety profiles compatible with clinical use.

=== Tumour targeting ===
There are two main approaches for generating tumour selectivity: transductional and non-transductional targeting.

- Transductional targeting involves modifying the viral coat proteins to target tumour cells while reducing entry to non-tumour cells. This approach to tumour selectivity has mainly focused on adenoviruses and HSV-1, although it is entirely viable with other viruses.
- Non-transductional targeting involves altering the genome of the virus so it can only replicate in cancer cells, most frequently as part of the attenuation of the virus.
  - Transcription targeting can also be used, where critical parts of the viral genome are placed under the control of a tumour-specific promoter. A suitable promoter should be active in the tumour but inactive in the majority of normal tissue, particularly the liver, which is the organ that is most exposed to blood born viruses. Many such promoters have been identified and studied for the treatment of a range of cancers.
  - Similarly, viral replication can be finely tuned with the use of microRNAs (miRNA) artificial target sites or miRNA response elements (MREs). Differential expression of miRNAs between healthy tissues and tumors permit to engineer oncolytic viruses detargeted from certain tissues of interest while allowing its replication in the tumor cells.

Double targeting with both transductional and non-transductional targeting methods is more effective than any one form of targeting alone.

=== Reporter genes ===
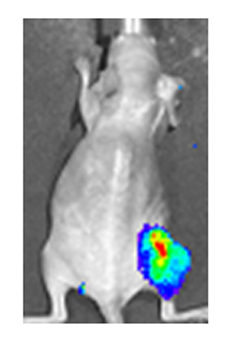
Viral luciferase expression in a mouse tumour

Both in the laboratory and in the clinic it is useful to have a simple means of identifying cells infected by the experimental virus. This can be done by equipping the virus with "reporter genes" not normally present in viral genomes, which encode easily identifiable protein markers. One example of such proteins is GFP (green fluorescent protein) which, when present in infected cells, will cause a fluorescent green light to be emitted when stimulated by blue light. An advantage of this method is that it can be used on live cells and in patients with superficial infected lesions, it enables rapid non-invasive confirmation of viral infection. Another example of a visual marker useful in living cells is luciferase, an enzyme from the firefly which in the presence of luciferin, emits light detectable by specialized cameras.

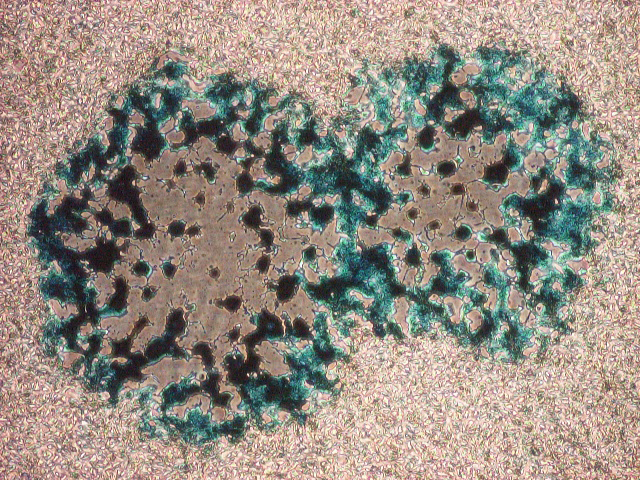
Vaccinia virus infected cells expressing beta-glucuronidase (blue colour)

The E. coli enzymes beta-glucuronidase and beta-galactosidase can also be encoded by some viruses. These enzymes, in the presence of certain substrates, can produce intense colored compounds useful for visualizing infected cells and also for quantifying gene expression.

=== Modifications to improve oncolytic activity ===
Oncolytic viruses can be used against cancers in ways that are additional to lysis of infected cells.

==== Suicide genes ====
Viruses can be used as vectors for delivery of suicide genes, encoding enzymes that can metabolise a separately administered non-toxic pro-drug into a potent cytotoxin, which can diffuse to and kill neighbouring cells. One herpes simplex virus, encoding a thymidine kinase suicide gene, has progressed to phase III clinical trials. The herpes simplex virus thymidine kinase phosphorylates the pro-drug, ganciclovir, which is then incorporated into DNA, blocking DNA synthesis. The tumour selectivity of oncolytic viruses ensures that the suicide genes are only expressed in cancer cells, however a "bystander effect" on surrounding tumour cells has been described with several suicide gene systems.

==== Suppression of angiogenesis ====
Angiogenesis (blood vessel formation) is an essential part of the formation of large tumour masses. Angiogenesis can be inhibited by the expression of several genes, which can be delivered to cancer cells in viral vectors, resulting in suppression of angiogenesis, and oxygen starvation in the tumour. The infection of cells with viruses containing the genes for angiostatin and endostatin synthesis inhibited tumour growth in mice. Enhanced antitumour activities have been demonstrated in a recombinant vaccinia virus encoding anti-angiogenic therapeutic antibody and with an HSV1716 variant expressing an inhibitor of angiogenesis.

==== Radioiodine ====
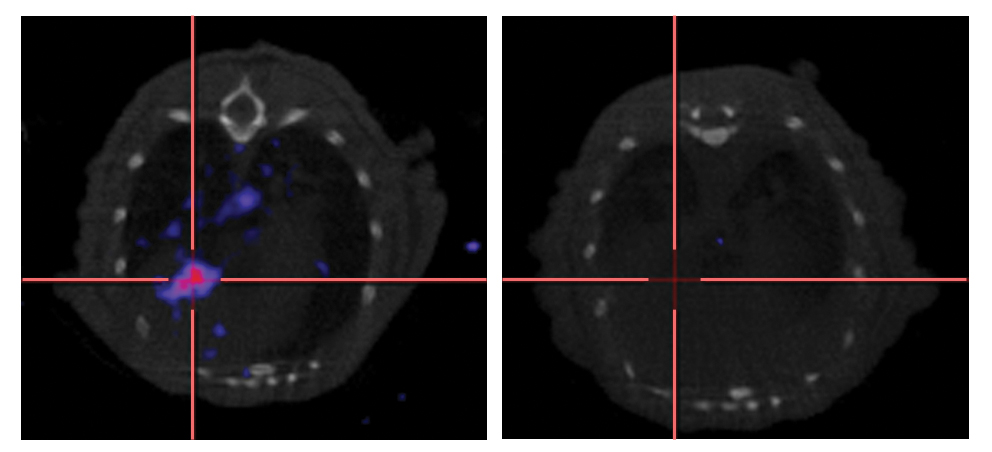
Adenoviral NIS gene expression in a mouse tumour (Located at the crosshairs) following intravenous delivery of virus (Left) compared to an uninfected control mouse (Right)

Addition of the sodium-iodide symporter (NIS) gene to the viral genome causes infected tumour cells to express NIS and accumulate iodine. When combined with radioiodine therapy it allows local radiotherapy of the tumour, as used to treat thyroid cancer. The radioiodine can also be used to visualise viral replication within the body by the use of a gamma camera. This approach has been used successfully preclinically with adenovirus, measles virus and vaccinia virus.

=== Clinical examples of engineered oncolytic viruses ===
Clinical studies of genetically engineered oncolytic viruses have advanced considerably, with several reaching late-stage trials or regulatory approval. These viruses incorporate modifications such as gene deletions for attenuation, alterations in tropism, transgene insertions (e.g., GM-CSF for immune stimulation), and tumor-specific promoters to enhance selectivity and efficacy. The table below summarizes key examples of genetically engineered oncolytic viruses. Data reflects developments as of 2025.

Virus name	Base virus	Key genetic modifications	Targeted cancer(s)	Highest clinical phase	Status / key results
Talimogene laherparepvec (T-VEC, Imlygic)	Herpes simplex virus 1 (HSV-1)	Deletions of ICP34.5 (attenuation) and ICP47 (enhanced antigen presentation); insertion of GM-CSF transgene	Advanced or unresectable melanoma; also tested in sarcoma, breast, pancreatic cancer	Approved (Phase III)	FDA and EMA approved in 2015 for unresectable melanoma; Phase III OPTiM trial showed durable response rate of ~19% vs ~1% with GM-CSF alone
Oncorine (H101)	Adenovirus serotype 5	Deletion of E1B-55kDa gene (attenuation in p53-competent cells)	Head and neck cancer (e.g., nasopharyngeal carcinoma)	Approved	Approved in China in 2005; reported improved response rates when combined with chemotherapy
Teserpaturev (G47Δ, Delytact)	Herpes simplex virus 1 (HSV-1)	Triple mutations: deletions of both γ34.5 genes, inactivation of ICP6, deletion of α47 (enhanced MHC-I presentation)	glioma (glioblastoma)	Approved (Phase II)	Conditionally approved in Japan in 2021; Phase II trial reported 1-year survival ~84% and median overall survival ~20 months
Nadofaragene firadenovec (Adstiladrin)	Adenovirus	Non-replicating vector; deletions of E1 and E3; encodes interferon alfa-2b	Non–muscle-invasive bladder cancer (BCG-unresponsive)	Approved (Phase III)	FDA approved in 2022; Phase III trial showed complete response ~51% at 3 months
Lerapolturev (PVSRIPO)	Poliovirus (Sabin type 1) with rhinovirus IRES	Replacement of poliovirus IRES with rhinovirus IRES (reduced neurovirulence, altered tropism)	Recurrent glioblastoma; also studied in melanoma and breast cancer	Phase II (ongoing)	Phase I/II study reported overall survival exceeding historical controls in recurrent glioblastoma cohorts
HSV1716 (Seprehvir)	Herpes simplex virus 1 (HSV-1)	Deletion of both ICP34.5 genes (attenuation)	Glioblastoma, melanoma, head and neck cancer	Phase I/II	Demonstrated safety in early clinical trials; long-term survivors reported
G207	Herpes simplex virus 1 (HSV-1)	Deletions of both ICP34.5 genes and ICP6 (attenuation)	Pediatric and refractory high-grade glioma	Phase I	Pediatric Phase I trial reported evidence of antitumor immune activation and extended survival in subsets
CG0070	Adenovirus	E2F-1 promoter–driven E1A for tumor-selective replication; GM-CSF insertion	Non–muscle-invasive bladder cancer (BCG-unresponsive)	Phase II	Phase II interim results reported complete response (CR) ~47% at 6 months overall (higher in CIS subsets) with intravesical administration
ONCOS-102	Adenovirus (Ad5/3 chimera)	Δ24 deletion in E1A; chimeric Ad5/3 fiber knob; GM-CSF insertion	Advanced solid tumors (various); explored in melanoma, mesothelioma, ovarian and other solid tumors	Phase I	Phase I study reported safety, immune activation, and disease control signals (including ~40% disease control among evaluable patients in exploratory analyses)
Pexa-Vec (JX-594)	Vaccinia virus	Thymidine kinase (TK) gene deletion (attenuation); GM-CSF insertion	Hepatocellular carcinoma	Phase III (completed)	Phase III PHOCUS trial (pexa-vec followed by sorafenib vs sorafenib) did not demonstrate improved clinical benefit; study was terminated early based on interim analysis

== Approved therapeutic agents ==
- Talimogene laherparepvec (OncoVEX GM-CSF), aka T-vec, by Amgen, successfully completed phase III trials for advanced melanoma in March 2013. In October 2015, T-VEC (under the brand name Imlygic) became the first approved oncolytic agent in the western world with its approval by the US FDA for the treatment of melanoma in patients with inoperable tumors. The European Medicines Agency followed 2 months later, clearing the way for its use in all EU member states. It is based on herpes simplex virus (HSV-1). It has also been tested in a Phase I trial for pancreatic cancer.
- Teserpaturev (G47∆), aka Delytact by Daiichi Sankyo is a first oncolytic virus therapy approved by Japan Ministry of Health, Labour and Welfare (MHLW). Delytact is a genetically engineered oncolytic herpes simplex virus type 1 (HSV-1) approved for treatment of malignant glioma in Japan.
- Oncorine (H101), a genetically modified adenovirus by Shanghai Sunway Biotech, was approved in 2005 by China's State Food and Drug Administration (SFDA) for the treatment of head and neck cancer.
- Vusolimogene oderparepvec (Tudriqev) was approved for medical use in the United States in August 2026.

== Investigational therapeutic agents ==
EnteroMix, an experimental multivirus oncolytic virotherapy developed in Russia, has been reported to be undergoing a Phase I clinical study within the Russian Federation. According to developer statements, it combines four replication-competent human enteroviruses administered intravenously.

== In conjunction with existing cancer therapies ==
It is in conjunction with conventional cancer therapies that oncolytic viruses have often shown the most promise, since combined therapies operate synergistically with no apparent negative effects.

=== Clinical trials ===
Onyx-015 (dl1520) underwent trials in conjunction with chemotherapy before it was abandoned in the early 2000s. The combined treatment gave a greater response than either treatment alone, but the results were not entirely conclusive.

Vaccinia virus GL-ONC1 was studied in a trial combined with chemo- and radiotherapy as standard of care for patients newly diagnosed with head and neck cancer.

Herpes simplex virus, adenovirus, reovirus and murine leukemia virus are also undergoing clinical trials as a part of combination therapies.

=== Pre-clinical research ===
Chen et al. (2001) used CV706, a prostate-specific adenovirus, in conjunction with radiotherapy on prostate cancer in mice. The combined treatment resulted in a synergistic increase in cell death, as well as a significant increase in viral burst size (the number of virus particles released from each cell lysis). No alteration in viral specificity was observed.

SEPREHVIR (HSV-1716) has also shown synergy in pre-clinical research when used in combination with several cancer chemotherapies.

The anti-angiogenesis drug bevacizumab (anti-VEGF antibody) has been shown to reduce the inflammatory response to oncolytic HSV and improve virotherapy in mice. A modified oncolytic vaccinia virus encoding a single-chain anti-VEGF antibody (mimicking bevacizumab) was shown to have significantly enhanced antitumor activities than parental virus in animal models.

== In fiction ==
In science fiction, the concept of an oncolytic virus was first introduced to the public in Jack Williamson's novel Dragon's Island, published in 1951, although Williamson's imaginary virus was based on a bacteriophage rather than a mammalian virus. Dragon's Island is also known for being the source of the term "genetic engineering".

The plot of the Hollywood film I Am Legend is based on the premise that a worldwide epidemic was caused by a viral cure for cancer.

== See also ==
- Measles virus encoding the human thyroidal sodium iodide symporter (MV-NIS)
- Oncolytic AAV
- Oncovirus, virus that can cause cancer
