= GL-ONC1 =

Experimental cancer treatment

GL-ONC1 (USAN: olvimulogene nanivacirepvec; abbreviated as Olvi-Vec) is an investigational therapeutic product consisting of the clinical grade formulation of the laboratory strain GLV-1h68, an oncolytic virus developed by Genelux Corporation. GL-ONC1 is currently under evaluation in Phase I/II human clinical trials in the United States and Europe.

GL-ONC1 (CAS Registry Number (CAS RN): 1473430–36–2) is a triple modified and attenuated vaccinia virus (Lister strain) that causes regression and elimination of a wide range of solid tumors in preclinical mouse models. It was generated by insertion of three expression cassettes (encoding Renilla luciferase-Aequorea green fluorescent protein fusion, beta-galactosidase, and beta-glucuronidase) into the F14.5L, J2R (encoding thymidine kinase) and A56R (encoding hemagglutinin) loci of the parental viral Lister strain genome, respectively. The oncolytic virus specifically infects and kills tumor cells which leads to oncolysis, immune activation and triggering anti-tumor immune responses.

== Clinical trials ==
=== Regional (cavity) administration ===
One Phase I/II Study of intraperitoneal administration of GL-ONC1 in patients with advanced peritoneal carcinomatosis has been completed. A Phase II study of intraperitoneal administration of GL-ONC1 (Olvi-Vec) in heavily pretreated patients with platinum-resistant/refractory ovarian cancer was completed. Positive clinical data have been reported in IGCS 2020 and ESMO 2020 conferences. A registration trial of Olvi-Vec(aka GL-ONC1)-primed immunochemotherapy is being planned.

In a Phase I study, intra-pleural administration of GL-ONC1 is being evaluated in patients with malignant pleural effusion, which is caused by cancer from malignant pleural mesothelioma, non-small cell lung cancer (NSCLC), or breast cancer. In this trial GL-ONC1 infection of tumor cells was identified in 6 out of 8 patients with epithelioid malignant pleural mesothelioma.

=== Systemic (intravenous) administration ===
Systemic administration of GL-ONC1 via intravenous injection was under investigation in multiple clinical trials:

In one study, GL-ONC1 was administered to patients with advanced solid organ tumors as a monotherapy. In another completed study, GL-ONC1 was given in combination with radiation therapy and cisplatin (CDDP) to patients with locoregionally advanced head and neck cancer.
