= Nagy Habib =

Egyptian professor of surgery

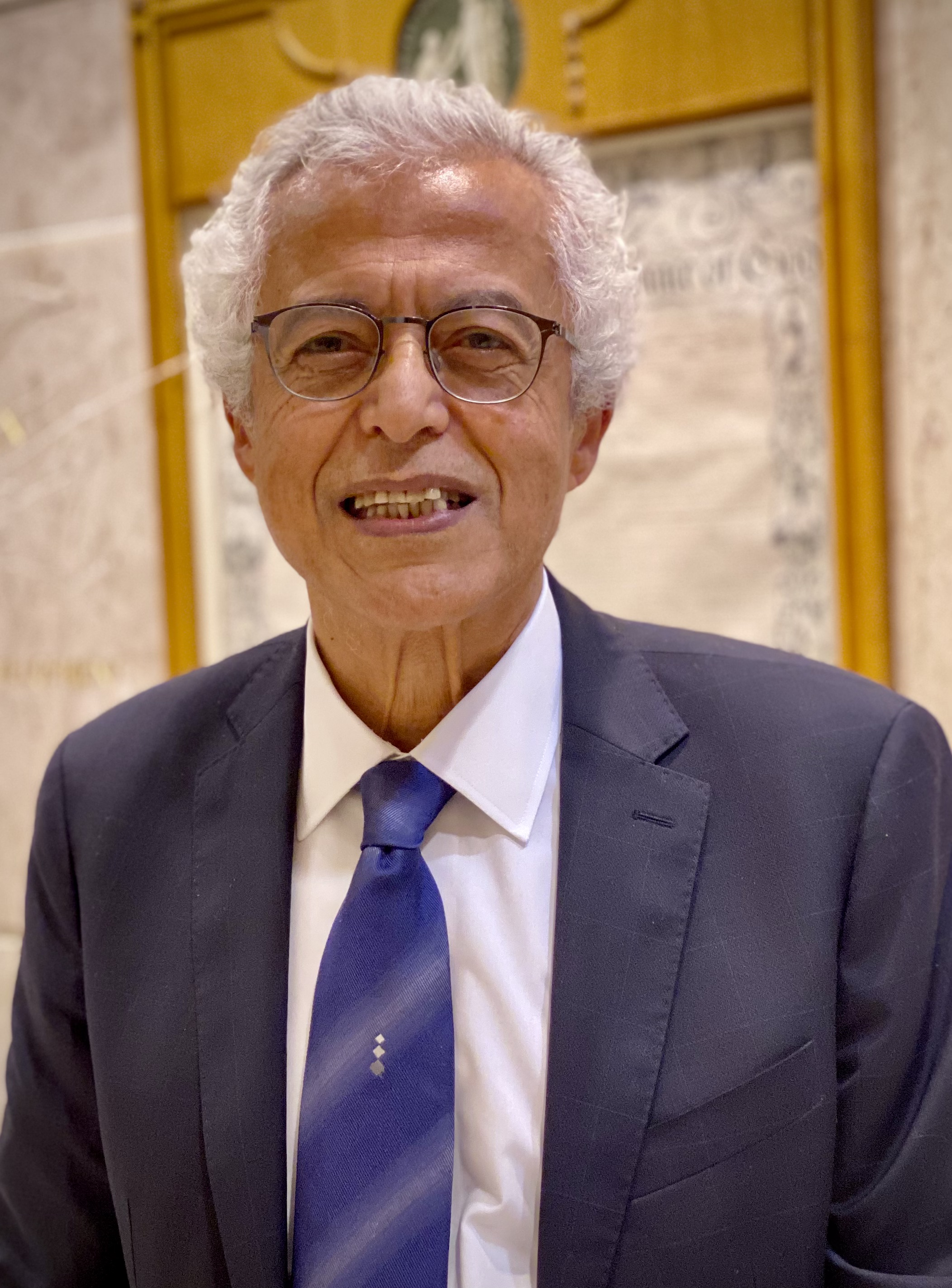
- Nagy Habib (2021)
- Born: 1952 (age 73–74)
- Occupation: Surgeon
- Known for: Radio-frequency based surgical devices
- Medical career
- Profession: Liver surgeon
- Institutions: Imperial College, London
- Research: Oncolytic adenoviruses; Liver cancer treatments

Nagy Habib (born 1952) is a British-Egyptian professor of hepato-biliary surgery at Imperial College, London, and is known for devising radio-frequency based liver resection devices which remove liver tumour with minimal blood loss. His work has also focused on stem cells and gene therapy.

== Early life and education ==
Nagy Habib was born in Cairo, Egypt, 1952. He trained under both Henri Bismuth and the transplant surgeon Thomas Starzl.

== Career ==
His work has focused on stem cells and gene therapy. He led the first clinical trial in the use of oncolytic adenoviruses for the treatment of liver cancer. It was carried out by means of a locally restricted injection into the main blood vessel to the liver. The findings were published in 2001. It was found to be safe, but the second phase of the trial did not find it effective. In 2004, he took stem cells from a person with liver cirrhosis and injected them into their liver artery, resulting in some improvement of liver function.

In 2003 he was appointed professor of hepato-biliary surgery at Imperial College, London. In June 2007 he was appointed pro-rector for Commercial Affairs at Imperial.

Habib developed several radio-frequency (RF) based liver resection devices. He devised the Habib RF device using the Habib needle, which has a modified version called the Habib 4X. It removes tumour with minimal blood loss. The procedure has come to be known as 'Habib's resection'.

MiNA Therapeutics, a biotechnology company dealing in small activating RNA technology was co-founded by Habib and his son Robert.

== Awards and honours ==
He was awarded the Takreem award in December 2012, for his work in liver cancer and radio-frequency based liver resection.

== Selected publications ==
=== Articles ===
- Habib, Nagy A.; Sarraf, Catherine E.; Mitry, Ragai R.; Havlík, Roman; Nicholls, Joanna; Kelly, Michael; Vernon, Clare C.; Gueret-Wardle, David; El-Masry, Rashad; Salama, Hosny; Ahmed, Rasha; Michail, Nagy; Edward, Ezzat; Jensen, Steen L. (10 February 2001). "E1B-deleted adenovirus (dl1520) gene therapy for patients with primary and secondary liver tumors". Human Gene Therapy. 12 (3): 219–226. doi:10.1089/10430340150218369. ISSN 1043-0342. PMID 11177559. (Co-author)
- Habib, Nagy; Salama, Hosny; Abd El Latif Abu Median, Ahmed; Isac Anis, Ilia; Abd Al Aziz, Rasha Ahmed; Sarraf, Catherine; Mitry, Ragai; Havlik, Roman; Seth, Prem; Hartwigsen, Jack; Bhushan, Reva; Nicholls, Joanna; Jensen, Steen (March 2002). "Clinical trial of E1B-deleted adenovirus (dl1520) gene therapy for hepatocellular carcinoma". Cancer Gene Therapy. 9 (3): 254–259. doi:10.1038/sj.cgt.7700431. ISSN 1476-5500. PMID 11896441. S2CID 42290755. (Co-author)
- Havlik, Roman; Jiao, Long R.; Nicholls, Joanna; Jensen, Steen Lindkaer; Habib, Nagy A. (April 2002). "Gene therapy for liver metastases". Seminars in Oncology. 29 (2): 202–208. doi:10.1053/sonc.2002.31678. ISSN 0093-7754. PMID 11951219. (Co-author)
- Ferko, A.; Leško, M.; Šubrt, Z.; Melichar, B.; Hoffman, P.; Dvořák, P.; Vacek, Z.; Liao, L.R.; Habib, N.A.; Kočí, J.; Motyčka, P. (December 2006). "A modified radiofrequency-assisted approach to right hemihepatectomy". European Journal of Surgical Oncology. 32 (10): 1209–1211. doi:10.1016/j.ejso.2006.07.013. PMID 16950592. (Co-author)

=== Books ===
- Hepatocellular Carcinoma: Methods and Protocols[. Totowa: Springer. 2000. ISBN 978-1-59259-079-7.
