= Peter Hansen =

Peter Hansen may refer to:

- Peter Hansen (actor) (1921–2017), American actor
- Peter Hansen (American football) (born 1979), American football coach at Stanford University
- Peter Hansen (basketball) (born 1965), American basketball player
- Peter Hansen (painter) (1868–1928), Danish painter
- Peter Hansen (politician), New Hampshire politician
- Peter Hansen (rower) (1921–2018), Danish rower
- Peter Hansen (SS officer), SS soldier, commander of the 29th and 15th Waffen Grenadier Division of the SS
- Peter Hansen (diplomat) (born 1941), Danish relief worker
- Peter Allan Hansen (1944–2012), Danish classical philologist
- Peter Andreas Hansen (1795–1874), Danish astronomer
- Peter J. Hansen (born 1956), American animal scientist
- Peter O. Hansen (1818–1895), translator of the Book of Mormon into Danish
- Peter Reinhard Hansen (born 1968), Danish economist at the Stanford University
- Lars Peter Hansen (born 1952), American economist

== See also ==
- Peter Hanson (born 1977), Swedish golfer
- Peter E. Hanson (1845–1914), American businessman and politician
- Peter B. Hanson, a passenger on United Airlines Flight 175
