= Vusolimogene oderparepvec =

Medication

Clinical data
- Trade names: Tudriqev
- Other names: RP1, vusolimogene oderparepvec-wtpg
- AHFS/Drugs.com: Tudriqev
- License data: US DailyMed: Vusolimogene oderparepvec
- Routes of administration: Intratumor injection
- Drug class: Antineoplastic
- ATC code: None

Legal status
- Legal status: US: ℞-only

Identifiers
- CAS Number: 2305659-09-8
- UNII: 45KLN7N6UV

Vusolimogene oderparepvec, sold under the brand name Tudriqev, is an anti-cancer medication used for the treatment of melanoma. It is a genetically modified herpes simplex virus type 1 oncolytic virus that is injected directly into tumors.

The most common non-laboratory adverse reactions include fatigue, pyrexia, infections, chills, musculoskeletal pain, nausea, diarrhea, injection site reaction, headache, cough, influenza like illness, rash, vomiting, pruritus, arthralgia, constipation, decreased appetite, dizziness, dyspnea, hemorrhage, edema, and abdominal pain.

Vusolimogene oderparepvec was approved for medical use in the United States in August 2026.

== Medical uses ==
Vusolimogene oderparepvec is indicated in combination with nivolumab for the treatment of adults with unresectable advanced cutaneous melanoma who experienced disease progression with a programmed death receptor-1-blocking antibody-based regimen.

Vusolimogene oderparepvec is an oncolytic viral therapy based on a modified herpes simplex virus type 1 that is engineered to selectively target and destroy cancer cells. Once inside a tumor, the virus replicates and breaks cancer cells apart, while simultaneously triggering the body’s immune system to recognize and attack the cancer. When used in combination with nivolumab, an anti-PD-1 immunotherapy, vusolimogene oderparepvec may help restore an anti-tumor immune response in patients whose cancer had previously stopped responding to immunotherapy.

== Adverse effects ==
The US prescribing information includes warnings and precautions for accidental exposure, herpetic infection or reactivation, injection procedure complications, and immune-mediated events.

The most common non-laboratory adverse reactions include fatigue, pyrexia, infections, chills, musculoskeletal pain, nausea, diarrhea, injection site reaction, headache, cough, influenza like illness, rash, vomiting, pruritus, arthralgia, constipation, decreased appetite, dizziness, dyspnea, hemorrhage, edema, and abdominal pain.

== Composition ==
Vusolimogene oderparepvec is an oncolytic herpes virus that was created by genetically engineering a strain of herpes simplex virus 1 (HSV-1) to express GM-CSF and a glycoprotein from the envelope of gibbon ape leukemia virus.

== History ==
The safety and efficacy of vusolimogene oderparepvec were evaluated in IGNYTE (NCT03767348), an open-label, multiregional, single-arm trial in 140 adults with stage IIIB, IIIC or IV unresectable advanced melanoma who experienced disease progression on at least eight consecutive weeks of prior anti-programmed death receptor-1-based therapy. Of the 140 participants, 91 participants with at least one noninjected lesion were included in the efficacy-evaluable population.

== Society and culture ==
=== Legal status ===
Vusolimogene oderparepvec was approved for medical use in the United States in August 2026. The US Food and Drug Administration (FDA) granted the application for vusolimogene oderparepvec, in combination with nivolumab, breakthrough therapy designation. The FDA granted the approval of Tudriqev to Replimune.

=== Names ===
Vusolimogene oderparepvec is the international nonproprietary name and the United States Adopted Name.

Vusolimogene oderparepvec is sold under the brand name Tudriqev.
