= Cancer virus =

Cancer virus refers to:

- An oncovirus, a virus that can cause cancer.
- Also generally the role of viruses in carcinogenesis.
- On the other hand to an oncolytic virus, a virus that preferentially infects and lyses cancer cells.
