= ONCOS-102 =

Virus classification
- (unranked): Virus
- Realm: Varidnaviria
- Kingdom: Bamfordvirae
- Phylum: Preplasmiviricota
- Class: Pharingeaviricetes
- Order: Rowavirales
- Family: Adenoviridae
- Genus: Mastadenovirus
- Species: Human mastadenovirus C
- Virus: ONCOS-102

Species of oncocytic human adenovirus

ONCOS-102 (Ad5/3-D24-GMCSF), (developed by Oncos Therapeutics) is an oncolytic adenovirus previously described as CGTG-102.

== Mechanism of action ==
It is modified to selectively replicate in p16/Rb-defective cells, which include most human cancer cells. In addition, ONCOS-102 codes for the granulocyte–macrophage colony-stimulating factor (GM-CSF), a potent immunostimulatory molecule.

The therapeutic potential of oncolytic virotherapy is not a simple consequence of the cytopathic effect but strongly relies on the induction of an endogenous immune response against transformed cells. Superior anticancer effects have been observed when oncolytic viruses are engineered to express (or be co-administered with) immunostimulatory molecules such as GM-CSF.

== Clinical trials ==
While the ONCOS-102 oncolytic adenovirus has shown efficacy as a single agent against several soft tissue sarcomas, it would also be appealing to use in combination with other regimes, as oncolytic viruses have demonstrated very little overlap in side effects with traditional therapies such as chemotherapy and radiation. ONCOS-102 has recently been studied in combination with doxorubicin, and a synergistic effect was observed. At least part of doxorubicin's mechanism of action is as an inducer of immunogenic cell death, and it has been suggested that immune response contributes to its overall anti-tumor activity. Doxorubicin has been shown to increase adenoviral replication in soft tissue sarcoma cells as well, potentially contributing to the observed synergistic effect in the virus/doxorubicin combination.

While in phase I was already used to treat 200 advanced cancer patients in the company's Advanced Therapy Access Program.
