= Beata Halassy =

Croatian virologist

- Born: 1971 (age 54–55)
- Known for: Self-treatment of breast cancer using oncolytic virotherapy
- Scientific career
- Fields: Virology, Immunology
- Workplaces: University of Zagreb

Beata Halassy (born 1971) is a Croatian virologist and immunologist. She is a senior scientist and group leader at the Centre for Research and Knowledge Transfer in Biotechnology at the University of Zagreb. She became known for successfully self-treating her own breast cancer with laboratory-grown viruses.

== Life ==
Halassy earned a doctorate in virology and immunology and specialized in the cultivation and purification of viruses in the laboratory. She worked for 19 years in the pharmaceutical industry, where she was involved in the production of vaccines and antibody therapeutics. Her research interests include the immunogenicity of complex antigens such as animal and human viruses and snake venoms, as well as the development of passive antibody therapies for the treatment of poisoning and viral diseases. She has published more than 75 scientific papers and holds several patents in Europe and the United States in the field of virus purification. During the COVID-19 pandemic, she focused on the development and introduction of serotherapy for COVID-19 in Croatia.

== Self-treatment of breast cancer ==
In 2020, at the age of 49, Halassy was diagnosed with breast cancer for the second time, after she had already undergone a mastectomy of her left breast. The recurrent tumour was classified as stage IIIB. She could not undergo further chemotherapy and decided to try a treatment called oncolytic virotherapy (OVT), which has not yet been approved for breast cancer, on herself.

Halassy cultivated and purified two different viruses in her laboratory: a measles virus and a vesicular stomatitis virus (VSV). The measles virus was an attenuated strain used in measles vaccines rather than the wild-type virus. Both viruses are known to infect cells from which her tumour originated and had already been used in clinical trials of OVT. Over a period of two months, a colleague administered the freshly prepared viruses directly into her tumour. The measles virus was used first, followed several weeks later by VSV as her immune response against measles increased. According to Kurzgesagt, at least 80 million virus particles were administered during the treatment. Following the first VSV injection, Halassy developed a fever and chills, which were the only systemic side effects reported during the experiment. Her oncologists monitored her during the self-treatment so that she could switch to conventional chemotherapy if necessary. The treatment appeared to be effective: the tumour shrank considerably, became softer and detached from the breast muscle and skin that it had previously infiltrated, allowing for easy surgical removal. The tumour decreased in size by approximately 63%, and examination following surgery found that roughly half of its mass consisted of immune cells. After the surgery, she received treatment with the cancer drug trastuzumab for one year to prevent recurrence. She has been cancer-free since then. As of November 2026, six years after the experimental treatment, her cancer had not recurred.

Her case study was published in the journal Vaccines by the controversial MDPI publishing house, which is widely regarded as a "predatory publisher", after it had received more than a dozen rejections from other academic journals, mainly due to ethical concerns regarding self-experimentation. Halassy emphasizes that self-medication with oncolytic viruses should not be the first approach following a cancer diagnosis. The positive experience with her self-treatment changed the focus of her research. In September 2024, she received funding to investigate OVT for the treatment of cancer in pets.
