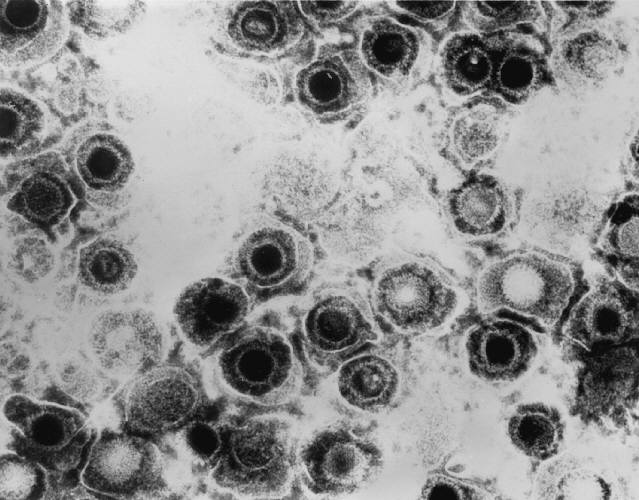
- TEM micrograph of a herpes simplex virus.

Virus classification
- (unranked): Virus
- Realm: Duplodnaviria
- Kingdom: Heunggongvirae
- Phylum: Peploviricota
- Class: Herviviricetes
- Order: Herpesvirales
- Family: Orthoherpesviridae
- Genus: Simplexvirus
- Species: Human alphaherpesvirus 1

= Oncolytic herpes virus =

Strains of herpes simplex virus used in cancer therapy

Many variants of herpes simplex virus have been considered for viral therapy of cancer; the early development of these was thoroughly reviewed in the journal Cancer Gene Therapy in 2002. This page describes (in the order of development) the most notable variants—those tested in clinical trials: G207, HSV1716, NV1020 and Talimogene laherparepvec (previously Oncovex-GMCSF). These attenuated versions are constructed by deleting viral genes required for infecting or replicating inside normal cells but not cancer cells, such as ICP34.5, ICP6/UL39, and ICP47.

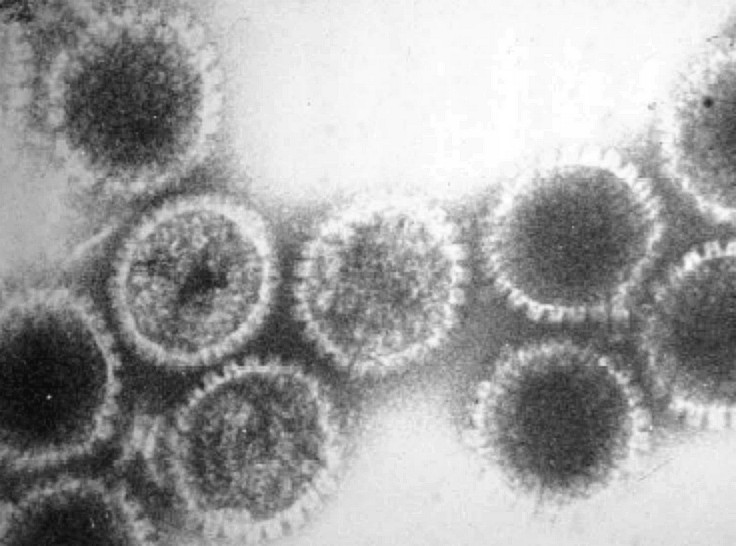
Electron Micrograph of herpes virus

== HSV1716 ==
HSV1716 is a first generation oncolytic virus developed by the Glasgow Institute of Virology, and subsequently by Virttu Biologics (formerly Crusade Laboratories, a spin-out from The Institute of Virology), to selectively destroy cancer cells. The virus has the trade name SEPREHVIR. It is based on the herpes simplex virus (HSV-1). The HSV1716 strain has a deletion of the gene ICP34.5. ICP34.5 is a neurovirulence gene (enabling the virus to replicate in neurons of the brain and spinal cord). Deletion of this gene provides the property of tumor-selective replication to the virus (i.e. largely prevents replication in normal cells, while still allowing replication in tumor cells), although it also reduces replication in tumor cells as compared to wild type HSV.

A vital part of the normal mechanism of HSV-1, the ICP34.5 protein has been proposed to condition post-mitotic cells for viral replication. With no ICP34.5 gene, the HSV-1716 variant is unable to overcome normal defences of healthy differentiated cells (mediated by PKR) to replicate efficiently. However, tumour cells have much weaker PKR-linked defences, which may be the reason why HSV1716 effectively kills a wide range of tumour cell lines in tissue culture.

An HSV1716 variant, HSV1716NTR is an oncolytic virus generated by inserting the enzyme NTR into the virus HSV1716 as a GDEPT strategy. In-vivo, administration of the prodrug CB1954 to athymic mice bearing either A431 or A2780 tumour xenografts, 48 hours after intra-tumoral injection of HSV1790, resulted in a marked reduction in tumour volumes and significantly improved survival compared to administration of virus alone. A similar approach has been taken with a variant of HSV1716 that expresses the noradrenaline transporter to deliver radioactive iodine into individual infected cancer cells, by tagging a protein that cancer cells transport. The nor-adrenaline transporter specifically transports a compound containing radioactive iodine across the cell membrane, using genes from the virus. The only cells in the body that receive a significant radiation dose are those infected and their immediate neighbours.

=== Clinical trials ===
- High grade glioma: Three phase I trials have been completed and two phase II trials are in preparation.
- Squamous cell carcinoma of head and neck: A phase I trial has been completed.
- Melanoma: A phase I trial has been completed.
- Hepatocellular carcinoma: A phase I/II trial is in preparation.
- Malignant pleural mesothelioma: A phase I/II trial is in progress.
- Non-CNS pediatric cancer: A phase I trial is in progress.

== G207 ==
G207 was constructed as a second-generation vector from HSV-1 laboratory strain F, with ICP34.5 deleted and the ICP6 gene inactivated by insertion of the E. coli LacZ gene.

Two phase I clinical trials in glioma were completed. The results of the first trial were published simultaneously with the first trial of HSV1716 in 2000, with commentators praising the demonstration of safety of these viruses when injected into brain tumours but also expressing disappointment that viral replication could not be demonstrated due to the difficulty of taking biopsies from brain tumours.

== NV1020 ==
NV1020 is an oncolytic herpes virus initially developed by Medigene Inc. and licensed for development by Catherex Inc. in 2010. NV1020 has a deletion of just one copy of the ICP34.5 gene and ICP6 is intact. A direct comparison of NV1020 and G207 in a mouse model of peritoneal cancer showed that NV1020 is more effective at lower doses.

=== Clinical trials ===
A Phase I/II study completed in 2008 evaluating NV1020 for treatment of metastatic colorectal cancer in the liver. The study assessed tumour response by CT scan and FDG-PET scans, showing 67% of patients had an initial increase in tumour size then followed by a decrease in 64% of patients.

== Talimogene laherparepvec ==
Talimogene laherparepvec is the USAN name for the oncolytic virus also known as 'OncoVEX GM-CSF'. It was developed by BioVex Inc. (Woburn, MA, USA & Oxford, UK) until BioVex was purchased by Amgen in January 2011.

It is a second-generation herpes simplex virus based on the JS1 strain and expressing the immune stimulatory factor GM-CSF. Like other oncolytic versions of HSV it has a deletion of the gene encoding ICP34.5, which provides tumor selectivity. It also has a deletion of the gene encoding ICP47, a protein that inhibits antigen presentation, and an insertion of a gene encoding GM-CSF, an immune stimulatory cytokine. Deletion of the gene encoding ICP47 also puts the US11 gene (a late gene) under control of the immediate early ICP47 promoter. The earlier and greater expression of US11 (also involved in overcoming PKR-mediated responses) largely overcomes the reduction in replication in tumor cells of ICP34.5-deleted HSV as compared to wild type virus, but without reducing tumor selectivity.

== Vusolimogene oderparepvec ==
Vusolimogene oderparepvec, sold under the brand name Tudriqev, is an anti-cancer medication used for the treatment of melanoma. It is a genetically modified herpes simplex virus type 1 oncolytic virus that is injected directly into tumors.

The most common non-laboratory adverse reactions include fatigue, pyrexia, infections, chills, musculoskeletal pain, nausea, diarrhea, injection site reaction, headache, cough, influenza like illness, rash, vomiting, pruritus, arthralgia, constipation, decreased appetite, dizziness, dyspnea, hemorrhage, edema, and abdominal pain.

Vusolimogene oderparepvec was approved for medical use in the United States in August 2026.

== See also ==
- Virotherapy
- Oncolytic virus
- Oncolytic adenovirus
- Herpes simplex virus
