= Peter J. Hansen =

American scientist

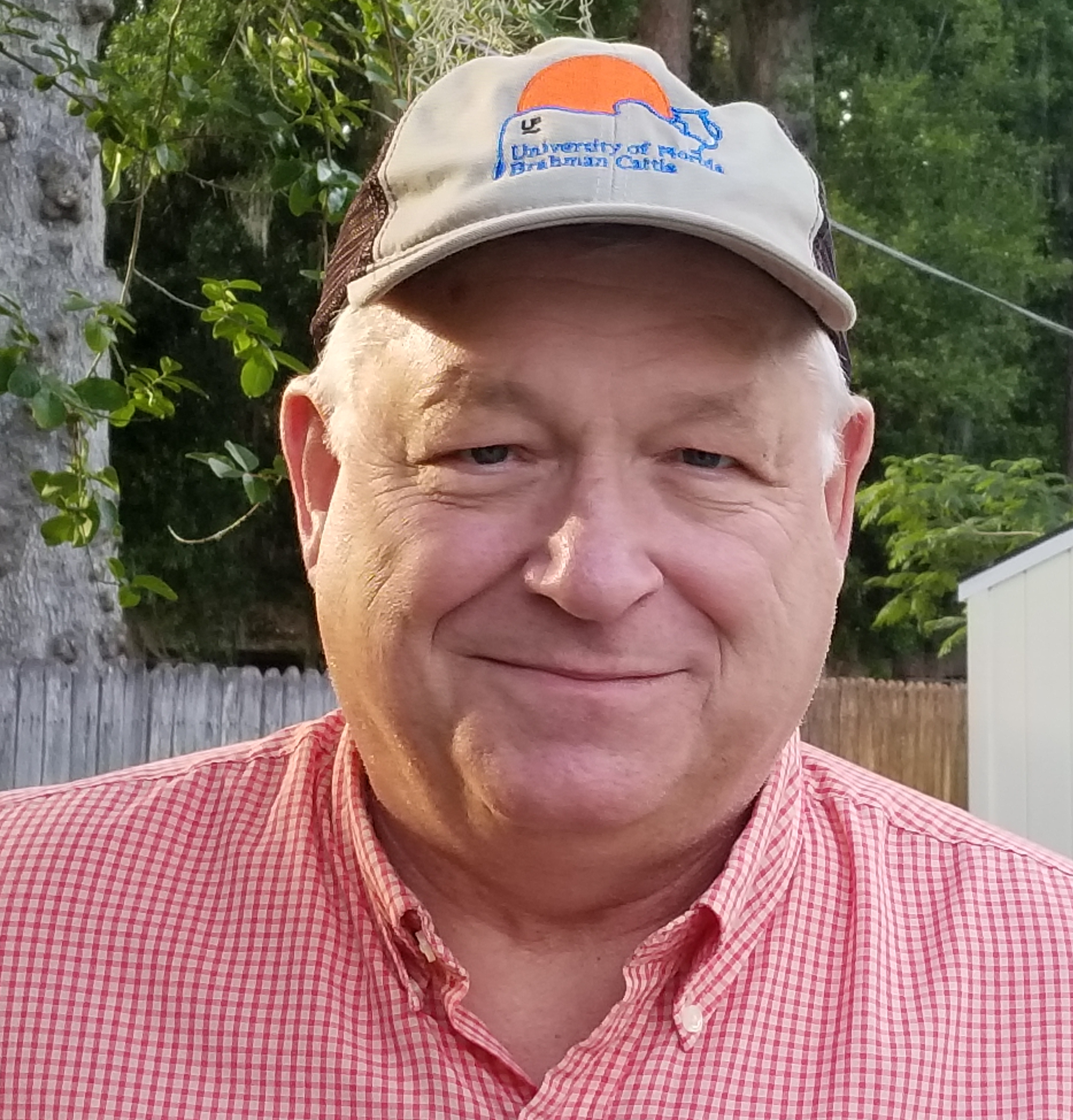
- Born: November 23, 1956; Oak Park, Illinois
- Education: University of Wisconsin–Madison University of Illinois at Urbana–Champaign
- Scientific career
- Fields: Animal Science, Reproductive Physiology, Developmental Biology, Environmental Physiology
- Workplaces: University of Florida
- Doctoral advisor: Edward R. Hauser
- Website: www.animal.ufl.edu/hansen

Peter J. Hansen is an American animal scientist and physiologist who serves as distinguished professor and L.E. "Red" Professor of Animal Sciences in the Department of Animal Sciences at University of Florida

== Research ==
Hansen's interest in livestock species started early in life while staying with relatives in County Wexford Ireland He first did research while an undergraduate in the Dept. of Dairy Science at the University of Illinois under the tutelage of Charles E. Graves. His doctoral research focused on regulation of reproduction by photoperiod in cattle and mice. Postdoctoral work with Roberts and Bazer kindled a love for understanding the establishment and maintenance of pregnancy, which subsequently became a career-long research interest. Among the most notable achievements as a faculty member at Florida has been identifying embryokines (see embryokine) that regulate development of the preimplantation embryo, demonstrating sex-dependent developmental programming during the preimplantation period, understanding how elevated temperature compromises reproduction, development of embryo transfer to increase pregnancy rate in heat-stressed cows, demonstration of the importance of the slick mutation in the prolactin receptor gene for increasing thermotolerance of cattle, and characterization of mechanisms for inhibition of uterine immune function by progesterone.

== Notable Awards ==
Hansen was the recipient of the highest awards given by the American Society of Reproductive Immunology, American Dairy Science Association and the American Society of Animal Science. He was the 2026 recipient of the Simmet Prize. He is a Fellow of the American Association for the Advancement of Science (2007), American Dairy Science Association (2009), American Society of Animal Science (2018) and the Society for the Study of Reproduction (2021)

== Selected publications ==
Hansen PJ (June 1985). "Seasonal modulation of puberty and the postpartum anestrus in cattle: A review". Livestock Production Science. 12 (4): 309–327. doi:10.1016/0301-6226(85)90131-9.

Hansen PJ (July 2004). "Physiological and cellular adaptations of zebu cattle to thermal stress". Animal Reproduction Science. 82–83: 349–369. doi:10.1016/j.anireprosci.2004.04.011. PMID 15271465.

Hansen PJ (November 2009). "Effects of heat stress on mammalian reproduction". Philosophical Transactions of the Royal Society B: Biological Sciences. 364 (1534): 3341–2250. doi:10.1098/rstb.2009.0131. PMC 2781849. PMID 19833646.

Hansen PJ, Dobbs, KB, Denicol, AC, Siqueira, LGB (January 2016). "Sex and the preimplantation embryo: implications of sexual dimorphism in the preimplantation period for maternal programming of embryonic development". Cell and Tissue Research. 363 (1): 237–247. doi:10.1007/s00441-015-2287-4. PMC 4703572. PMID 26391275.

Hansen PJ, Tribulo P (September 2019). "Regulation of present and future development by maternal regulatory signals acting on the embryo during the morula to blastocyst transition - insights from the cow". Biology of Reproduction. 101 (3): 526–537. doi:10.1093/biolre/ioz030. PMC 8127039. PMID 31220231.

Hansen PJ (May 2023). "Review: Some challenges and unrealized opportunities toward widespread use of the in vitro-produced embryo in cattle production". Animal. 17 (Suppl 1) 100745. Bibcode:2023Anim...1700745H. doi:10.1016/j.animal.2023.100745. PMC 10659117. PMID 37567654. S2CID 260783558.
