= Molgramostim =

Chemical compound

Clinical data
- AHFS/Drugs.com: International Drug Names
- ATC code: L03AA03 (WHO)

Identifiers
- CAS Number: 99283-10-0
- ChemSpider: none
- UNII: B321AL142J

Molgramostim is a recombinant granulocyte macrophage colony-stimulating factor which functions as an immunostimulator.
