= Enadenotucirev =

Species of oncocytic human adenovirus

Enadenotucirev is an investigational oncolytic virus that is in clinical trials for various cancers.

It is an oncolytic A11/Ad3 Chimeric Group B Adenovirus, previously described as ColoAd1.

Enadenotucirev has also been modified with additional genes using the tumor-specific immuno-gene therapy (T-SIGn) platform to develop novel cancer gene therapy agents.

The T-SIGn vectors at clinical study stage are:

- NG-350A: This vector contains two transgenes expressing the heavy and light chains for a secreted CD40 agonist monoclonal antibody.
- NG-641: This vector contains four transgenes expressing secreted interferon alpha, the chemokines CXCL9, CXCL10 and an anti-FAP/anti-CD3 bispecific T-cell activator

In Jan 2015 the European Medicines Agency's (EMA) Committee for Orphan Medical Products (COMP) designated enadenotucirev as an orphan medicinal product for the treatment of ovarian cancer.

== Clinical trials ==
Two clinical trials have been completed with enadenotucirev. The EVOLVE study and the MOA study.

As of June 2019, there are two active phase 1 trials: OCTAVE (in ovarian cancer) and SPICE (in multiple solid tumor indications).

Of the T-SIGn viruses, NG-350A has an ongoing clinical study.

== See also ==
- Oncolytic adenovirus
  - Oncolytic adenovirus § Directed evolution
