= Matthias Gromeier =

American neurosurgeon

Matthias Gromeier is a Professor in the Department of Neurosurgery at Duke University Medical Center, who has developed a way to re-engineer a poliovirus to inspire the human immune system to kill cancer cells in a specific set of cancers. The re-engineered virus, called PVSRIPO, cannot replicate itself in normal cells, but can replicate itself in cancer cells that have an overabundance of the protein marker that the poliovirus targets.

PVSRIPO, which Gromeier engineered himself as a postdoc in the 1990s is thought to induce an anti-tumor immune response against the tumor. Phase I trials in glioblastoma (GBM, one of the most deadly brain cancers) results have been very promising. The traditional treatment against GBM, surgical resection followed by chemo usually gives rise to only a 12-month survival in patients; some patients treated with PVSRIPO are still alive, symptomless, 3.5 years after treatment. Only the worst cases of GBM that did not respond to any other treatments were enrolled in the trial. The lab is now testing the virus in other tumors, including breast, pancreas, and many others.

Other research has experimented with cancer treatments using viruses including HIV, smallpox, and measles. However, Dr. Gromeier noted that polio was the most ideal choice due to its ability to seep out and attach itself to a receptor that is found on the surface of the cells that make up nearly every kind of solid tumor. As Gromeier noted, "It’s almost as if polio had evolved for the purpose".

== Early life ==
Gromeier was born in Germany. During Gromeier's compulsory military service, prior to attending university, he worked at a large breast-cancer center. Says Gromeier, "Breast cancer, back then especially, was a losing battle... It wouldn’t fulfill my life to prescribe chemotherapy so patients suffered and it didn’t work." Gromeier originally intended to study HIV. In the late 1980s, protease inhibitors were not yet saving lives, and the disease was still considered a death sentence. However, in a twist of fate, Gromeier was unable to find a physician with an HIV lab who would welcome him as a student. On the subject, Gromeier notes “The only lab that would take me was a tired, not very successful polio lab.” He earned his medical degree from the University of Hamburg in 1992, with the intentions of becoming a leading cancer researcher.

After medical school, Gromeier completed a postdoctoral fellowship at New York’s Stony Brook University from 1993 to 1996, as well as a postdoctoral associate position from 1996 to 1999. There he worked in the lab of Eckard Wimmer, one of the world’s leading virologists and a polio specialist. Gromeier spent much of this time studying polio pathogenesis, which is how the virus causes the infectious disease associated with iron lungs and Franklin D. Roosevelt. Although a polio vaccine was developed in the 1950s that nearly ended the disease, it still exists in a handful of developing countries.

While at Stony Brook, in 1993, Gromeier engineered the virus he’d later use in the Duke cancer trials, swapping out a critical part of the structure with the equivalent part of the human rhinovirus, which causes the common cold. Gromeier also studied receptors, proteins on the surface of cells that viruses evolve to recognize. Gromeier discovered that the poliovirus binds to a receptor called CD155, which is found on many solid tumor cells. Through a succession of experiments, starting in the mid-’90s, Gromeier concluded that the modified poliovirus could potentially target cancer. “This was an ignorance-is-bliss type situation,” he says. “I didn’t have preconceived notions of what cancer was and how to fight it. Sometimes for researchers, if you’re very, very well read, very exposed to current opinion, it can mean that you’re biased and have a closed mind.”

Gromeier's early thinking focused on what he now calls a “simple paradigm”: the ability of his modified poliovirus to infect and kill tumor cells. “That’s relatively rare,” he says. “Viruses have evolved over millennia to do certain things, and killing tumors is not generally part of their natural program.”

== Duke University Medical Center ==
In 1999, Gromeier accepted a position in the Department of Neurosurgery at the Duke University Medical Center, to which he was drawn in large part by the strength of its brain-tumor research. He had always seen brain cancer as a prospective target for his work. “Poliovirus is the virus that’s most capable of causing the most damage in the brain,” he says. It invades the central nervous system and can paralyze the muscles we need to walk, swallow, and even breathe. “It may sound counterintuitive,” he says, “but I saw this as a sign that it might be a good agent to be used in the brain.” Gromeier currently serves as Professor of Neurosurgery, a Professor in Molecular Genetics and Microbiology, a Professor in Medicine, and a Member of the Duke Cancer Institute.

=== Phase 1 Clinical Trial ===
In 2011, 20-year-old nursing student Stephanie Lipscomb was diagnosed with glioblastoma, as doctors found a tennis-ball-sized tumor in her brain. After unsuccessful attempts at radiation and chemotherapy, 98% of Lipscomb's tumor was surgically removed However, her glioblastoma diagnosis returned in 2012. With recurrent glioblastoma, Lipscomb became the first patient in Gromeier's phase 1 clinical trial in May 2012. After an MRI revealed that the tumor had inflamed in October, indicating that the immune system had awakened and had begun to fight the cancerous cells, Lipscomb became the first successful patient in the trial.

Doctors have concluded that the polio virus initiates the killing, but the immune system possesses sole responsibility, once activated. Upon her enrollment in the trial, Lipscomb's tumor shrank consistently for 21 months, until it eventually disappeared completely. She is cancer-free; the only thing that remains is a hole, an artifact of early surgery.

With the early success, the team raised the dose in the next few patients in hope of an even better result. Donna Clegg, a 60-year-old social worker from Idaho, was the 14th patient in the trial (also facing a glioblastoma diagnosis). In an attempt to hasten the eradication of glioblastoma tumors, doctors opted to use Clegg to test an increased dose. Clegg's polio infusion was three times more potent than the one that worked for Lipscomb. In Clegg, doctors saw the expected inflammation as her immune system attacked the tumor. But the higher dose caused an immune response that was much too powerful: the inflammation put so much pressure on her brain, she became partially paralyzed. This caused Clegg to drop out of the trial.

As of March 2015, there had been 22 patients in the polio trial: 11 died, with 6 of those having been served the higher dose. The other 11 continued to improve: four were in remission.

When asked about the first two patients in the trial, Dr. Darell Bigner, head of the study and of Duke's brain tumor center, provided, “Oh absolutely...[it’s fair to say they are] in remission and I think they would tell you that they consider themselves normal again...I’m very reluctant to use the ‘cure’ word...because we don't know how long it takes to say that a glioblastoma has been cured, but I am beginning to think about it”.

== "Breakthrough" Status ==
In May 2016, Gromier's therapy was granted "breakthrough therapy designation" by the Food and Drug Administration, indicating that the treatment may offer a substantial improvement over available standard therapy.
