= Genelux Corporation =

Biopharmaceutical company

- Type: Public
- Traded as: Nasdaq: GNLX
- Industry: Biopharmaceuticals
- Founded: 2001; 25 years ago
- Headquarters: Westlake Village, California, U.S.
- Products: Olvi-Vec
- Website: genelux.com

Genelux Corporation is a publicly traded late clinical-stage company developing oncolytic viral immunotherapies for patients suffering from aggressive and/or difficult-to-treat solid tumor types. The Company’s most advanced product candidate, Olvi-Vec (olvimulogene nanivacirepvec), is a proprietary, modified strain of the vaccinia virus (VACV), a stable DNA virus with a large engineering capacity.

The core of Genelux’s discovery and development efforts revolves around the company's proprietary CHOICE™ platform from which the Company has developed an extensive library of isolated and engineered oncolytic vaccinia virus immunotherapeutic product candidates, including Olvi-Vec.

The company is currently entered its pivot Phase 3 study in Platinum resistant/refractory ovarian cancer (PRROC). Trial design based on VIRO-15 Phase 2 trial which showed independent anti-tumor activity of Olvi-Vec and reversal of platinum resistance in the TME.

== Locations ==
Genelux Corp. is headquartered in Westlake Village, California, with additional facilities in San Diego, California.

== Olvi-Vec ==
Genelux’s lead oncology compound is Olvi-Vec (formally GL-ONC1, clinical grade formulation of the laboratory strain GLV-1h68), c is a proprietary, oncolytic vaccinia virus, modified to increase its safety, tumor selectivity and therapeutic potential. Vaccinia virus is a non-human pathogen. Virus-mediated oncolysis results in immunogenic cell death and triggers immune activation and memory for long-term immunotherapy against cancer. Olvi-Vec has been administered to more than 150 patients in clinical studies. In these studies, Olvi-Vec was generally well tolerated and the data provided evidence of clinical benefit. Most recently, Genelux announced the publication of positive topline results from its Phase 2 VIRO-15 trial of Olvi-Vec-primed immunochemotherapy in heavily pretreated patients with platinum-resistant or -refractory ovarian cancer (PRROC) in JAMA Oncology.

Key Findings of Viro-15 Trial

- All patients completed both Olvi-Vec infusions and chemotherapy. Median follow-up duration was 47.0 months (95% CI, 35.9 months to NA, upper limit not reached).
- ORR by RECIST1.1 was 54% (95% CI, 33%-74%), with Duration of Response of 7.6 months (95% CI, 3.7-9.6 months). Disease Control Rate was 88% (21/24). Overall, 19 of 22 evaluable patients (86%) showed tumor shrinkage. ORR by tumor biomarker CA-125 was 85% (95% CI, 65%-96%), and 25 of 26 evaluable patients (96%) exhibited decreased CA-125 levels.
- Median PFS by RECIST1.1 was 11.0 months (95% CI, 6.7-13.0 months), and 6-month PFS rate was 77%. Median PFS was 10.0 months (95% CI, 6.4-NA months) in the platinum-resistant group and 11.4 months (95% CI, 4.3-13.2 months) in the platinum-refractory group.
- Median overall survival (OS) was 15.7 months (95% CI, 12.3-23.8 months) in all patients, with median OS of 18.5 months (95% CI, 11.3-23.8 months) in platinum-resistant group and 14.7 months (95% CI, 10.8-33.6 months) in platinum-refractory group.
- Most frequent treatment-related adverse events (TRAEs) (any grade, grade 3) were pyrexia (63.0%, 3.7%) and abdominal pain (51.9%, 7.4%). There were no grade 4 treatment-related adverse events and no treatment-related discontinuations or deaths.

== V2ACT ==
V2ACT Immunotherapy is an immuno-oncology modality composed of Olvi-Vec and TVAX Immunotherapy (vaccine-enhanced adoptive T cell therapy). V2ACT uses both Genelux and TVAX as a combination therapy. The rationale for V2ACT Immunotherapy stems from scientific evidence that vaccination generates an immune response which increases the number of neoantigen-specific T cells in the body and that Olvi-Vec induces an acute inflammatory response that increases cancer tissue receptivity for the clinical effects of adoptively transferred neoantigen-specific effector T cells. This generates support for the view that V2ACT Immunotherapy may safely achieve superior efficacies against a wide range of cancers. TVAX Immunotherapy provides a neoantigen-specific adoptive T cell therapy, with an excellent safety profile and powerful anti-cancer effects on a wide range of cancers demonstrated in preclinical and Phase 2 clinical trials.

In June of 2023, the companies announced the issuance of a United States patent covering the combination of an adoptive T cell therapy/oncolytic viral cancer treatment that is exclusively licensed to V2ACT Therapeutics™, LLC, a joint venture between Genelux Corporation and TVAX Biomedical, Inc.
