= PVSRIPO =

Virus classification
- (unranked): Virus
- Realm: Riboviria
- Kingdom: Orthornavirae
- Phylum: Pisuviricota
- Class: Pisoniviricetes
- Order: Picornavirales
- Family: Picornaviridae
- Genus: Enterovirus
- Species: Enterovirus C
- Strain: PVSRIPO

PVSRIPO, or PVS-RIPO, is the name of a modified polio virus that has recently shown promise for treating cancer. It is the focus of clinical trials being conducted at Duke University.

PVS-RIPO consists of a genetically modified nonpathogenic version of the oral poliovirus Sabin type 1. The internal ribosome entry site (IRES) on the poliovirus was replaced with the IRES from human rhinovirus type 2 (HRV2), to avoid neurovirulence. Once administered, the virus enters and begins replicating within cells that express CD155/Necl5, which is an onco-fetal cell adhesion molecule that is common across solid tumors.

A website at Duke University describes many of properties of PVSRIPO, and historical background about using viruses to oppose cancer. According to that website,

The FDA approved clinical trials with PVS-RIPO in brain tumor patients recently. Since May 2012, five brain tumor patients have been treated. Remarkably, there have been no toxic side effects with PVS-RIPO whatsoever, even at the highest possible dose (10 billion infectious virus particles).

The potential value of PVSRIPO was the focus of a 2015 story on 60 Minutes.

In May 2016, the US Food and Drug Administration granted it breakthrough therapy designation for glioblastoma.

== Clinical trials ==
=== Glioblastoma Trials ===
==== Adult ====
A Phase 1 clinical trial published in the New England Journal of Medicine in 2018 enrolled 61 patients with recurrent glioblastoma between 2012 and 2017, with overall survival at 24 and 36 months reaching 21%, compared to 14% at 24 months and 4% at 36 months in matched historical controls. Istari Oncology initiated the LUMINOS-101 Phase 2 trial, investigating PVSRIPO in combination with pembrolizumab in patients with recurrent glioblastoma, testing whether the combination enhances antitumor immune responses.

==== Children ====
A Phase 1b safety study published in 2023 assessed PVSRIPO delivery directly into brain tumors of pediatric patients with recurring high-grade glioma. The trial enrolled eight patients between ages 4 and 21, each receiving one intratumoral infusion. Treatment was well tolerated, with transient side effects including headaches and seizures in most patients. None experienced lasting severe complications or died from treatment effects. Several patients needed bevacizumab to manage brain swelling around the tumor site. Patient survival averaged approximately four months, though one participant lived beyond 22 months. Researchers concluded the delivery method showed acceptable safety for advancement to further testing in young patients.

=== Melanoma Trials ===
A Phase 1 trial in patients with unresectable, treatment-resistant melanoma who had progressed on anti-PD-1 therapy demonstrated antitumor activity, with 4 of 12 patients achieving confirmed responses and durable control in some cases.The virus was injected directly into tumors and caused minimal side effects. Four patients showed tumor shrinkage or complete disappearance, with disease control lasting over 19 months in some cases.

In 2021, the FDA granted Fast Track designation and Orphan Drug Designation to PVSRIPO for the treatment of advanced melanoma in patients with disease progression after anti-PD-1/anti-PD-L1 therapy. A Phase 2 trial (LUMINOS-102) is testing PVSRIPO both as monotherapy and combined with checkpoint inhibitors in melanoma patients whose disease progressed after initial immunotherapy.

=== Bladder Cancer Trials ===
PVSRIPO is being investigated in the LUMINOS-103 basket trial, including sub-studies in muscle-invasive and non-muscle-invasive bladder cancer, with combinations involving pembrolizumab or monotherapy via intravesical administration. Clinical trials in muscle-invasive bladder cancer began following FDA clearance, testing PVSRIPO combined with pembrolizumab as presurgical treatment or for patients with inoperable metastatic disease. In 2023, the first patient with non-muscle-invasive bladder cancer was treated with PVSRIPO monotherapy directly into the bladder.

== Regulatory Designations by US Food and Drug Administration ==
- Breakthrough therapy (glioblastoma, 2016)
- Fast track (melanoma, 2021)
- Orphan drug (melanoma, 2021)

== See also ==
- Oncolytic virus
