= Oncolytic AAV =

Adeno-associated virus (AAV) has been researched as a viral vector in gene therapy for cancer treatment as an oncolytic virus. Currently there are not any FDA approved AAV cancer treatments, as the first FDA approved AAV treatment was approved December 2017. However, there are many Oncolytic AAV applications that are in development and have been researched.

== Adeno-Associated Virus Therapy ==
AAV is a small virus that was found as a contaminant in adenovirus studies. AAV is a non-pathogenic virus, so it is currently being investigated for many gene therapy applications including oncolytic cancer treatments due to its relatively safe nature. AAV also has little risk for insertional mutagenesis, a common problem when dealing with viral vectors, as its transgenes are normally expressed episomally. It was found that AAV genome inserts in less than ~10% of occasions AAV infects a cell and the expression is less than when episomally expressed. AAV can only package genomes between 2 – 5.2 kb in size when they are flanked with inverted terminal repeat sequences (ITRs), but optimally holds a genome of 4.1 to 4.9 kb in length. This limits the therapeutic application of AAV as a cancer treatment as the gene the virus carries must be able to fit in less than 4.9 kb .

=== Targeting ===
AAV, and its many different strains, known as serotypes, to each have their unique cell-type targeting preferences, also known as tropism. In order to target viral vector gene therapies to disease sites, researchers often exploit the simplicity of the AAV virus capsid to mutate new targeting behaviors into the virus. In example, AAV has been mutated to target primary glial blastoma cells by combining regions of many AAV serotypes.

On top of combining the serotypes, mutating foreign sequences into the capsid known to have certain behaviors has been used to target cancer sites. For example, Matrix metalloproteinases (MMPs) are known to be up-regulated in cancer sites. By inserting an infection blocking tetra-aspartic acid residue into the capsid flanked by MMP cleavable sequences, a lab has developed a protease activatable virus (PAV) using AAV. In the presence of high concentrations of MMPs, the cleavable sequences are removed and the virus is “un-locked”, allowing infection in the neighboring diseased cells. PAV is still being optimized. A study to change out the tetra-aspartic acid blocking residues revealed that the negative charge of the residues is likely what is needed to block transduction. PAV is currently in investigation for targeting of ovarian and pancreatic cancer with the plan of delivering cytotoxic transgenes.

== Examples of Oncolytic AAV in Development ==
AAV-2-TRAIL: The tumor necrosis factor-related apoptosis-inducing ligand (TRAIL) has been studied when delivered by AAV serotype 2 capsids on human cancer cell lines. It was found that the different cell lines had different sensitivities to the AAV-2-TRAIL delivery and enhanced by pre-treatment of the cells with chemotherapy drug cisplatin. When mice with tumor xenograft models were injected with AAV-2-TRAIL intratumorally with and without cisplatin, tumor sizes were found to decrease equally significantly with cisplatin and AAV-2-TRAIL. The tumor weight decreased even more significantly when cisplatin and AAV-2-TRAIL where combined.

AAV-2-HSV-TK: Herpes simplex virus type 1 thymidine kinase (HSV-TK) is a common anti-cancer therapy that converts the ganciclovir (GCV) into the toxic GCV-triphosphate within cells expressing the enzyme. This induces the cell and bystander toxicity to the neighboring cells. When cultured with MCF-7 cancer cells, AAV2 delivery of HSV-TK significantly decreased viability of the cells only when in the presence of GCV.

AAV-2-sc39TK: sc39TK is a five-codon substitution from HSV-TK where silent mutations have been introduced into the GCV-resistant spliced acceptor and donor sequences. The result is a hyperactive version of HSV-TK. When combined with GCV, these mutants also result in high levels of cancer cell death in-vitro. Furthermore, when injected into mouse xenograft models, tumor size has been shown to significantly decrease over a period of 30 days. It has also been investigated in combination with AAV-2-mTOR which targets the mammalian target of rapamycin (mTOR), an investigated anti-cancer target.

== Oncolytic AAV Clinical Trials ==
AAV-DC-CTL: A clinical trial is currently in Phase I investigation of Oncolytic AAV treatments for stage IV gastric cancer in China. In these trials AAV has been used to deliver Carcinoembryonic antigen (CEA). CEA is normally produced in the gastric tissue of infants and would be used in these studies to target cancer cells for CEA specific cytotoxic-T-cell lysis. In this regard, the virus would be used to make cancer cells be recognized by the immune system for destruction. As a result, AAV will target cancer cells and the CEA specific cytotoxic-T-cells will target the cells that AAV infects.
