= Embryokine =

Embryokines (Greek: embryuon "embryo" + kinōs "movement") are regulatory molecules produced by the oviduct and endometrium in the reproductive tract that modulate embryonic growth and development.

Embryokines include growth factors such as insulin-like growth factor-1, and activin a transforming growth factor; cytokines such as colony stimulating factor 2, WNT regulatory proteins including DKK1; Other small molecule amino acids are included that regulate embryonic development through the mTOR signalling pathway. Prostacyclin 1 can activate peroxisome proliferator-activated receptor 6 to increase blastocyst hatching, and cannabinoids that can also act to regulate implantation and development.
