= Sargramostim =

Pharmaceutical drug

Clinical data
- Trade names: Leukine, others
- AHFS/Drugs.com: Monograph
- MedlinePlus: a693005
- License data: US DailyMed: Sargramostim
- Routes of administration: Intravenous, subcutaneous
- ATC code: L03AA09 (WHO)

Legal status
- Legal status: US: ℞-only

Identifiers
- IUPAC name: Human granulocyte macrophage colony stimulating factor
- CAS Number: 123774-72-1
- DrugBank: DB00020
- ChemSpider: none
- UNII: 5TAA004E22
- KEGG: D05803
- ChEMBL: ChEMBL1201670

Chemical and physical data
- Formula: C_{639}H_{1006}N_{168}O_{196}S_{8}
- Molar mass: 14434.54 g·mol^{−1}

Sargramostim, sold under the brand name Leukine among others, is a recombinant granulocyte macrophage colony-stimulating factor (GM-CSF) that functions as an immunostimulator. It is administered via intravenous infusion or via subcutaneous injection.

== Medical uses ==
Sargramostim is primarily used for myeloid reconstitution after autologous or allogeneic bone marrow transplantation. It is also used to treat neutropenia induced by chemotherapy during the treatment of acute myeloid leukemia. Additionally, it is used as a medical countermeasure for treating people who have been exposed to sufficient radiation to suppress bone marrow myelogenesis.

== Contraindications ==
Sargramostim should not be used in people with known hypersensitivity to GM-CSF, yeast-derived products or any component of the product and for concomitant use with chemotherapy and radiotherapy.

There is a formulation with benzyl alcohol, which is toxic to babies; other formulations should be used. Sargramostim has not been tested in pregnant women but appears to be toxic to fetuses. There is no data as to whether sargramostim is expressed in breast milk.

== Adverse effects ==
Some people have experienced anaphylaxis when given the drug; and infusion reactions have occurred as well, including edema, capillary leak syndrome, a build up of fluid around the lungs and around the heart. Irregular heart rhythms have occurred, especially in people with a history of that problem. It suppresses some white blood cells, and may promote tumor growth.

== Pharmacology ==
Sargramostim is a version of GM-CSF, which has a normal role in human biology, causing progenitor cells to differentiate into neutrophils, monocytes, macrophages, and, myeloid-derived dendritic cells; it can also activate mature granulocytes and macrophages, and can contribute to the differentiation of megakaryocytic progenitors and erythroid progenitor cells.

== Chemistry ==
Sargramostim is a recombinant version of GM-CSF, which is a glycoprotein made of 127 amino acids; sargramostim is mixture of three versions of GM-CSF that have molecular weights of 19,500, 16,800 and 15,500 daltons. It is manufactured in yeast.

== History ==
The sequence of human GM-CSF was first identified in 1985 and soon three recominbant human GM-CSFs were produced, one in bacteria, one in mammalian cells, and one in yeast; Immunex developed GM-CSF manufactured in yeast into Leukine. Clinical trials of sargramostim were initiated in 1987; in that same year it was administered to six people as part of a compassionate-use protocol for the victims of cesium irradiation from the Goiânia accident.

It was approved by the FDA in March 1991, under the brand name Leukine for acceleration of white blood cell recovery following autologous bone marrow transplantation in people with non-Hodgkin's lymphoma, acute lymphocytic leukemia, or Hodgkin's disease. In November 1996, the FDA also approved sargramostim for treatment of fungal infections and replenishment of white blood cells following chemotherapy. A liquid formulation was approved in 1995. Immunex was acquired by Amgen in 2002. As part of the acquisition, Leukine was spun off to Berlex, which became Bayer HealthCare in 2007.

In January 2008, Bayer informed healthcare professionals of the market withdrawal of the current liquid formulation of sargramostim. The liquid formulation was withdrawn because of an upward trend in spontaneous reports of adverse reactions, including syncope (fainting), which are temporally correlated with a change that was made to the formulation around April 2007 to include edetate disodium (EDTA). The upward trend in adverse reaction reporting rates had not been observed with the use of lyophilized sargramostim. The original liquid formulation without EDTA was returned to the market in the US in May 2008.

In 2009, Genzyme acquired the rights to Leukine from Bayer, including the manufacturing facility in the Seattle area.

In March 2018 the label was extended to use as a countermeasure for acute radiation syndrome.

In February 2018, Partner Therapeutics, Inc. acquired the global rights to develop, manufacture, and commercialize Leukine (sargramostim) from Sanofi.

== Society and culture ==
=== Legal status ===
In June 2025, the Committee for Medicinal Products for Human Use of the European Medicines Agency adopted a positive opinion, recommending the granting of a marketing authorization under exceptional circumstances for the medicinal product Imreplys, intended for the treatment of people with hematopoietic acute radiation syndrome (H-ARS) following acute exposure to myelosuppressive doses of radiation. The applicant for this medicinal product is Partner Therapeutics Ltd.
