= Infected cell protein 34.5 =

Viral protein

Neurovirulence factor ICP34.5

Identifiers
- Organism: Human alphaherpesvirus 1 strain 17
- Symbol: ICP34.5
- UniProt: P36313
Search for
- Structures: Swiss-model
- Domains: InterPro

Infected cell protein 34.5 (ICP-34.5, ICP34.5) is a protein expressed by the γ34.5 gene in viruses such as herpes simplex virus; it blocks a cellular stress response to viral infection. It shares the C-terminal regulatory domain (InterPro: IPR019523) with protein phosphatase 1 subunit 15A/B.

When a cell is infected with a virus, protein kinase R is activated by the virus' double-stranded DNA,. Protein kinase R then phosphorylates a protein called eukaryotic initiation factor-2A (eIF-2A), which inactivates eIF-2A. EIF-2A is required for translation so by shutting down eIF-2A, the cell prevents the virus from hijacking its own protein-making machinery. Viruses in turn evolved ICP34.5 to defeat the defense; it activates protein phosphatase-1A which dephosphorylates eIF-2A, allowing translation to occur again. A herpesvirus lacking the γ34.5 gene will not be able to replicate in normal cells because it cannot make proteins.

The ICP34.5 deletion is useful for the construction of oncolytic herpes viruses, as cancer cells do not restrict replication as strongly.

== See also ==
- Viral nonstructural protein
