= Granulocyte-macrophage colony-stimulating factor =

Mammalian protein found in Homo sapiens

CSF2
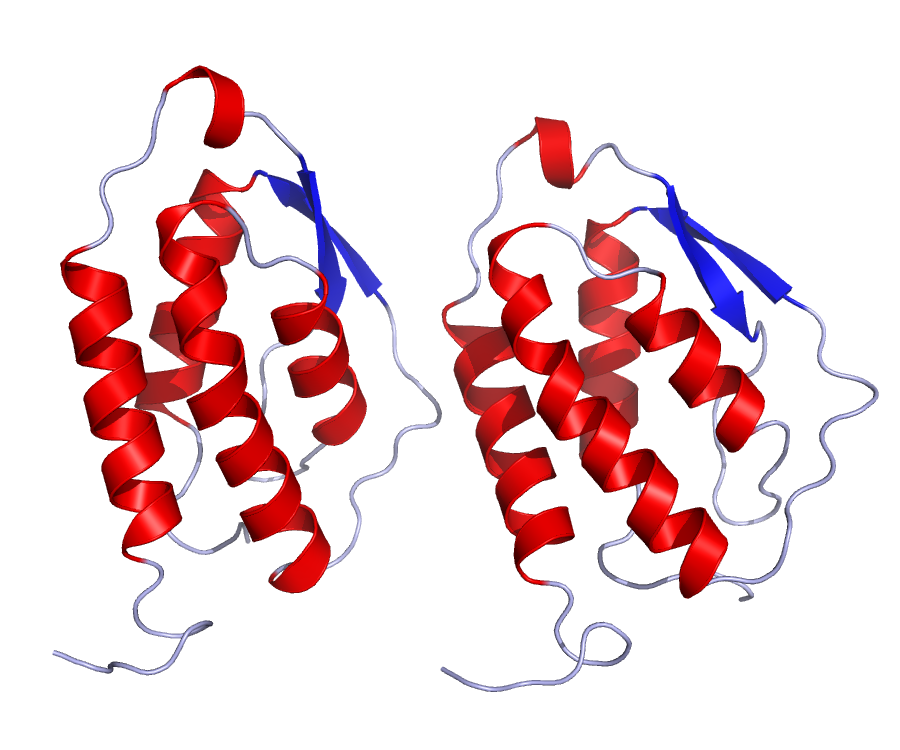

Identifiers
- Aliases: CSF2, GMCSF, colony stimulating factor 2, CSF
- External IDs: OMIM: 138960; MGI: 1339752; GeneCards: CSF2
Available structures
PDB	Ortholog search: PDBe RCSB
PDB	List of PDB id codes 1CSG, 2GMF, 4NKQ, 5C7X, 5D70, 5D71, 5D72, 4RS1

Gene location (Human)
Chr.	Chromosome 5 (human)
Band	5q31.1	Start	132,073,789 bp
Band	5q31.1	End	132,076,170 bp

Gene location (Mouse)
Chr.	Chromosome 11 (mouse)
Band	11 B1.3|11 32.13 cM	Start	54,138,097 bp
Band	11 B1.3|11 32.13 cM	End	54,140,493 bp
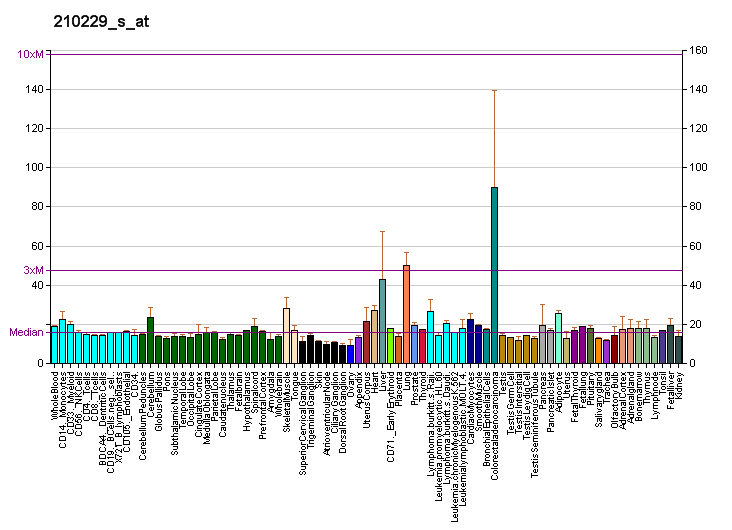
RNA expression pattern
Bgee	Human / Mouse (ortholog); Top expressed in: cartilage tissue; upper lobe of left lung; gallbladder; stromal cell of endometrium; appendix; islet of Langerhans; muscle tissue; smooth muscle tissue; granulocyte; rectum / Top expressed in: left lung lobe; right lung lobe; jejunum; duodenum; piriform cortex; artery; haematopoietic system; thymus; colon; carotid body; More reference expression data
BioGPS	More reference expression data
Gene ontology
Molecular function	growth factor activity; granulocyte macrophage colony-stimulating factor receptor binding; protein binding; protein tyrosine kinase activity; cytokine activity
Cellular component	extracellular region; intracellular membrane-bounded organelle; extracellular space
Biological process	negative regulation of cytolysis; positive regulation of macrophage derived foam cell differentiation; regulation of cell population proliferation; MAPK cascade; positive regulation of podosome assembly; negative regulation of extrinsic apoptotic signaling pathway in absence of ligand; positive regulation of interleukin-23 production; positive regulation of gene expression; embryonic placenta development; epithelial fluid transport; regulation of gene expression; dendritic cell differentiation; myeloid dendritic cell differentiation; macrophage activation; cellular response to lipopolysaccharide; immune response; monocyte differentiation; response to fluid shear stress; response to silicon dioxide; neutrophil differentiation; peptidyl-tyrosine phosphorylation; regulation of circadian sleep/wake cycle, sleep; histamine secretion; positive regulation of tyrosine phosphorylation of STAT protein; cellular response to granulocyte macrophage colony-stimulating factor stimulus; regulation of myeloid cell differentiation; regulation of signaling receptor activity; negative regulation of transcription, DNA-templated; cytokine-mediated signaling pathway; positive regulation of cell population proliferation; macrophage differentiation
Sources:Amigo / QuickGO
Orthologs
Databases	NCBI: entry; OMA: entry
Species	Human	Mouse
Entrez	1437	12981
Ensembl	ENSG00000164400	ENSMUSG00000018916
UniProt	P04141	P01587
RefSeq (mRNA)	NM_000758	NM_009969
RefSeq (protein)	NP_000749	NP_034099
Location (UCSC)	Chr 5: 132.07 – 132.08 Mb	Chr 11: 54.14 – 54.14 Mb
PubMed search
- Wikidata
View/Edit Human	View/Edit Mouse

Granulocyte-macrophage colony-stimulating factor
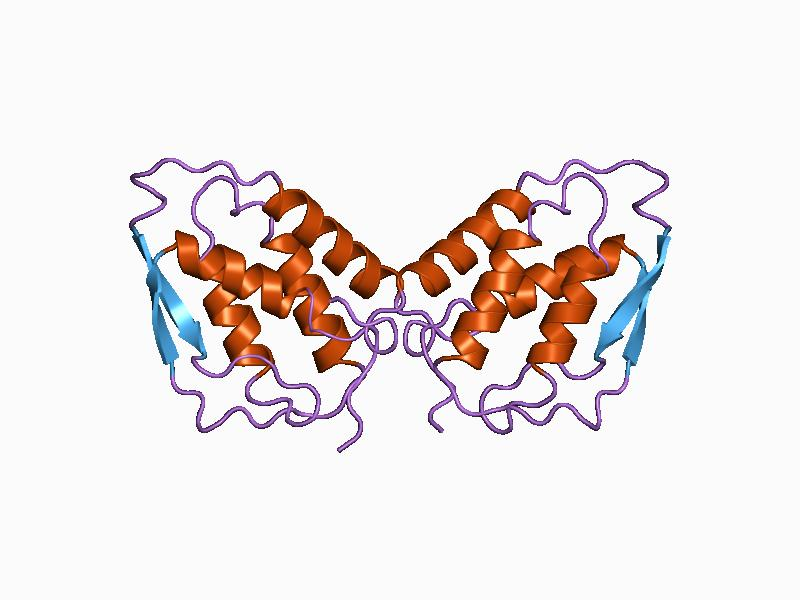
- three-dimensional structure of recombinant human granulocyte-macrophage colony-stimulating factor (rhGM_CSF)

Identifiers
- Symbol: GM_CSF
- Pfam: PF01109
- Pfam clan: CL0053
- InterPro: IPR000773
- PROSITE: PDOC00584
- SCOP2: 2gmf / SCOPe / SUPFAM
Available protein structures:
- PDB: IPR000773 PF01109 (ECOD; PDBsum)
- AlphaFold: IPR000773; PF01109

Granulocyte-macrophage colony-stimulating factor
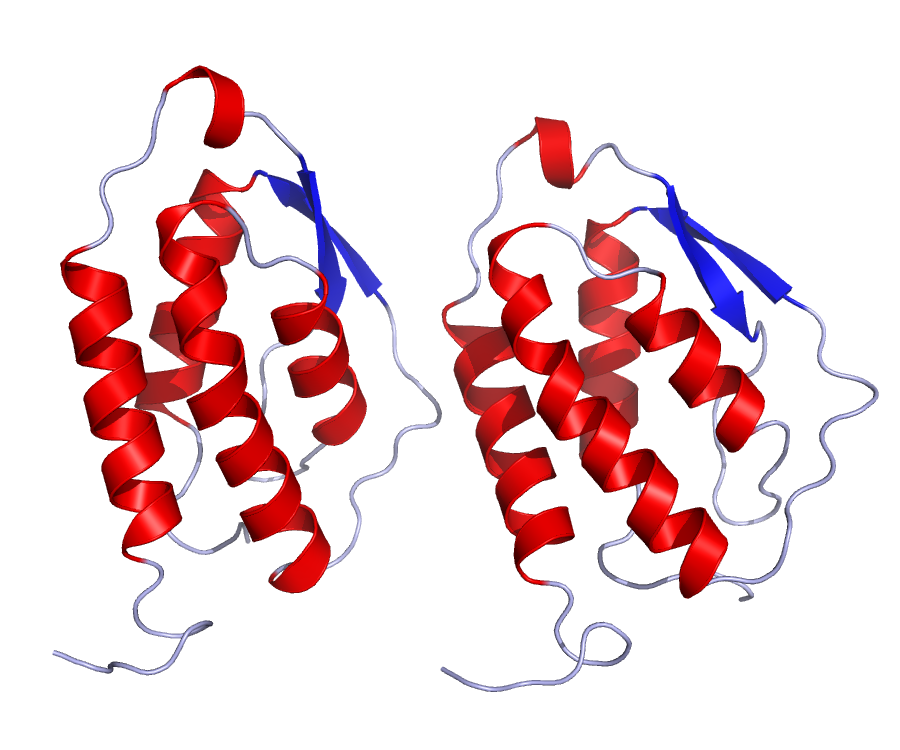

Clinical data
- ATC code: L03AA09 (WHO)

Identifiers
- IUPAC name: Human granulocyte macrophage colony stimulating factor
- CAS Number: 83869-56-1
- DrugBank: DB00020
- ChemSpider: none

Chemical and physical data
- Formula: C_{639}H_{1006}N_{168}O_{196}S_{8}
- Molar mass: 14434.54 g·mol^{−1}

Granulocyte-macrophage colony-stimulating factor (GM-CSF), also known as colony-stimulating factor 2 (CSF2), is a monomeric glycoprotein secreted by macrophages, T cells, mast cells, natural killer cells, endothelial cells and fibroblasts that functions as a cytokine. The pharmaceutical analogs of naturally occurring GM-CSF are called sargramostim and molgramostim.

Unlike granulocyte colony-stimulating factor, which specifically promotes neutrophil proliferation and maturation, GM-CSF affects more cell types, especially macrophages and eosinophils.

== Function ==
GM-CSF is a monomeric glycoprotein that functions as a cytokine—it is a white blood cell growth factor. GM-CSF stimulates stem cells to produce granulocytes (neutrophils, eosinophils, and basophils) and monocytes. Monocytes exit the circulation and migrate into tissue, whereupon they mature into macrophages and dendritic cells. Thus, it is part of the immune/inflammatory cascade, by which activation of a small number of macrophages can rapidly lead to an increase in their numbers, a process crucial for fighting infection.

GM-CSF also has some effects on mature cells of the immune system. These include, for example, enhancing neutrophil migration and causing an alteration of the receptors expressed on the cell surface.

GM-CSF signals via signal transducer and activator of transcription, STAT5. In macrophages, it has also been shown to signal via STAT3. The cytokine activates macrophages to inhibit fungal survival. It induces deprivation of intracellular free zinc and increases production of reactive oxygen species that culminate in fungal zinc starvation and toxicity. Thus, GM-CSF facilitates development of the immune system and promotes defense against infections.

GM-CSF also plays a role in embryonic development by functioning as an embryokine produced by the reproductive tract.

== Genetics ==
The human gene has been localized in close proximity to the interleukin 3 gene within a T helper type 2-associated cytokine gene cluster at chromosome region 5q31, which is known to be associated with interstitial deletions in the 5q- syndrome and acute myelogenous leukemia. GM-CSF and IL-3 are separated by an insulator element and thus independently regulated. Other genes in the cluster include those encoding interleukins 4, 5, and 13. GM-CSF contains an AU-rich element (ARE) 51 nucleotides in length in its 3' untranslated region, which was noticed in 1985 and subsequently used to discover the multiple functions of AREs in mRNAs.

== Glycosylation ==
Human granulocyte-macrophage colony-stimulating factor is glycosylated in its mature form.

== History ==
Human GM-CSF was first cloned in 1985, and soon afterwards three potential drug products were being made using recombinant DNA technology: molgramostim was made in Escherichia coli and is not glycosylated, sargramostim was made in yeast, has a leucine instead of proline at position 23 and is somewhat glycosylated, and regramostim was made in Chinese hamster ovary cells (CHO) and has more glycosylation than sargramostim. The amount of glycosylation affects how the body interacts with the drug and how the drug interacts with the body.

At that time, Genetics Institute, Inc. was working on molgramostim, Immunex was working on sargramostim (Leukine), and Sandoz was working on regramostim.

Molgramostim was eventually co-developed and co-marketed by Novartis and Schering-Plough under the trade name Leucomax for use in helping white blood cell levels recover following chemotherapy, and in 2002 Novartis sold its rights to Schering-Plough.

Sargramostim was approved by the US FDA in 1991 to accelerate white blood cell recovery following autologous bone marrow transplantation under the trade name Leukine, and passed through several hands, ending up with Genzyme, which was subsequently acquired by Sanofi. Leukine is now owned by Partner Therapeutics (PTx).

Imlygic was approved by the US FDA in October 2015, and in December 2015 by the EMA, as an oncolytic virotherapy, commercialized by Amgen Inc. This oncolytic herpes virus, named Talimogene laherparepvec, has been genetically engineered to express human GM-CSF using the tumor cells' machinery.

== Clinical significance ==
GM-CSF is found in high levels in joints with rheumatoid arthritis, and blocking GM-CSF as a biological target may reduce inflammation or damage. Some drugs (e.g. otilimab) are being developed to block GM-CSF. In critically ill patients GM-CSF has been trialled as a therapy for the immunosuppression of critical illness, and has shown promise restoring monocyte and neutrophil function, although the impact on patient outcomes is currently unclear and awaits larger studies.

GM-CSF stimulates monocytes and macrophages to produce pro-inflammatory cytokines, including CCL17. Elevated GM-CSF has been shown to contribute to inflammation in inflammatory arthritis, osteoarthritis, colitis asthma, obesity, and COVID-19.

== Clinical trials ==
Monoclonal antibodies against GM-CSF are being used as treatment in clinical trials against rheumatoid arthritis, ankylosing spondylitis, and COVID-19.

== See also ==
- CFU-GM
- Filgrastim (Neupogen, a granulocyte colony-stimulating factor (G-CSF) analog)
- Granulocyte-macrophage colony-stimulating factor receptor
- Lenzilumab
- Pegfilgrastim (Neulasta, a PEGylated form filgrastim)
