= GCC =

GCC commonly refers to:

- Gulf Cooperation Council, an organization of Arab states
- GNU Compiler Collection, a free and open-source cross-platform compiler

GCC may also refer to:

== Education ==
- Good Counsel College, Innisfail, Queensland, Australia
- Greenwich Community College, England
- Gazipur Cantonment College, Bangladesh
- Grace Christian College, Quezon City, Philippines
- Galahitiyawa Central College, Ganemulla, Sri Lanka

=== Canada ===
- Garden City Collegiate, a high school in Winnipeg, Manitoba
- Grenville Christian College, near Brockville, Ontario

=== United States ===
- Genesee Community College, Batavia, New York
- Germanna Community College, Virginia
- Gila Community College, Arizona
- Girls Catholic Central High School, in Detroit, Michigan
- Glendale Community College (Arizona)
- Glendale Community College (California)
- Gloucester County College, former name of Rowan College at Gloucester County, New Jersey
- Gogebic Community College, Michigan
- Greenfield Community College (Massachusetts)
- Greensburg Central Catholic High School, Pennsylvania
- Grove City College, a private college in Pennsylvania
- Guam Community College, Guam

== Organizations ==
- Gauhati Cine Club, a film society in Assam
- Grand Challenges Canada, a Canadian non-profit organization
- Global China Connection, a student-run non-profit organization

=== Companies ===
- Gene Codes Corporation, a bioinformatics software company
- General Cinema Corporation, a former theater chain acquired by AMC Theatres
- General Computer Corporation, a computer printer manufacturer, formerly a video-game producer
- Ghirardelli Chocolate Company, a US chocolate company

=== Government and politics ===
- Garde côtière canadienne, the Canadian Coast Guard
- Gazipur City Corporation, one of the city corporations in Bangladesh
- General Chiropractic Council, regulatory body for chiropractic in the UK
- General Consumer Council for Northern Ireland, Northern Irish public body
- Georgia Cryptologic Center, a US National Security Agency facility in Augusta, Georgia
- Glasgow City Council, United Kingdom
- Global Climate Coalition, a defunct grouping of businesses opposing action on climate change
- Global Certification Commission, an independent body of the World Health Organization for the eradication of wild polio
- Grand Council of the Crees (GCC(EI)), Canada
- Graphic Communications Conference, an American trade union
- Great Council of Chiefs, a former constitutional body in Fiji
- Greater Chennai Corporation, civic body that governs the city of Chennai in India.

=== Religion ===
- Gateway Community Church, Baguio City, Philippines
- Georgia-Cumberland Conference of Seventh-day Adventists, or Georgia-Cumberland Conference, US
- Grace Community Church, California, US
- Granger Community Church, Indiana, US
- Great Commission Churches, Ohio, US

== Sport ==
- Glenorchy Cricket Club, Tasmania, Australia
- Godalming Cricket Club, Surrey, England
- Golden Coast Conference, an American collegiate water polo conference
- Goodwood Cricket Club, Chichester, England
- Greater Cleveland Conference, Ohio, US
- Gulf Coast Conference, a defunct NCAA college athletic conference

== Science and technology ==
- General communication channel, in computer networking
- Global carbon cycle, the biogeochemical cycle by which carbon is exchanged
- Guanylyl cyclase c, an enzyme
- Green-cheeked conure, a species of parakeet
- Gaussian correlation conjecture, a mathematical conjecture proved in 2014 by Thomas Royen
- GCC, a codon for the amino acid alanine

== Other uses ==
- Gibbon Conservation Center, in Santa Clarita, California, US
- Georgia Cyber Center, in Augusta, Georgia, US
- Gillette–Campbell County Airport (IATA and FAA LID codes), Wyoming, US
- Greensboro Coliseum Complex, an entertainment and sports complex in Greensboro, North Carolina, US
- Knight Grand Cross of the Royal Order of Cambodia
- Grand Cross of the Military Order of Christ
- Global capability center, an offshore or nearshore entity

== See also ==
- GC-C (disambiguation)
- GCCS (disambiguation)
