= Shedding =

Shedding may refer to:

- Shedding or moulting of body parts
- Desquamation, pathologic or non-pathologic skin shedding
- Sheddase and Ectodomain shedding
- Shedding game, a family of card games where the objective is to get rid of one's hand first
- Shedding of the coat in cats and dogs, a process of natural hair loss
- Viral shedding which is the release of virus progeny following successful reproduction during a host-cell infection
- Vaccine shedding, an anti-vaccination myth about the release of infective virus following vaccination
- Woodshedding, practicing a difficult passage repeatedly until it can be performed flawlessly

== See also ==
- Sheading a subdivision of the Isle of Man
