= GCCS =

GCCS may refer to:

- Gilboa-Conesville Central School, in New York, United States
- Global Command and Control System
- Global Conference on CyberSpace
- Gloucester County Christian School, in Sewell, New Jersey, United States
- Government Chinese Character Set
- Government Code and Cypher School at Bletchley Park
- Grove City Christian School, in Ohio, United States

== See also ==
- GCC (disambiguation)
