= Naysán Sahba =

UNICEF Director of Global Communication and Advocacy

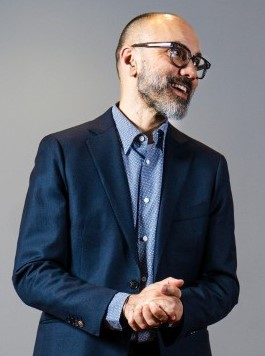
- Naysán Sahba
- Education: University of Guelph; University of British Columbia
- Title: Director of Global Communication and Advocacy at UNICEF

Naysán Sahba is the Director of Global Communication and Advocacy at UNICEF, serving the role as of 2023. Sahba has built a well-established career in the public sector, acting previously as the Manager of Global Engagement and Partnerships at the World Bank Group between 2020 and 2023, and as the Global Communication Director of the United Nations Environment Programme, between 2014 and 2020.

== Early life and education ==
Sahba is a Canadian national and was born in Iran in 1972, spending his early life across Iran, England, India, Canada, and Israel. Sahba received a bachelor's degree in English Literature in 1995 at the University of British Columbia and a Master of Arts in International Development and English Studies in 1997 from the University of Guelph.

== Career ==
Sahba began his career in communication for development through the company, Bisharat Media Development Associates, that he founded with Alex Frame (then vice-president of the Canadian Broadcasting Corporation). Within that capacity, he worked with indigenous community radio stations across Latin America and produced multimedia content about sustainable approaches to development. Sahba then went on to work as a consultant for WHO and UNICEF, as part of an inter-agency effort at polio eradication, before taking up full-time employment with the latter organisation in 2003. In his first job at UNICEF, Sahba was stationed in Lucknow, India, where he led campaign communications for the Global Polio Eradication Initiative and immunisation interventions in Uttar Pradesh, India's most populous state.

In 2005, Sahba transferred to the Programme Communication section of UNICEF's India headquarters in New Delhi, where he led the organization's entertainment-education initiatives. Sahba is credited as the Creator and Executive Producer of Kyunki Jeena Issi Ka Naam Hai, a top-five prime time TV drama series that ran for over 500 episodes and was watched by over 145 million viewers. He has also co-authored research articles on the program exploring the impact of entertainment-education on social norms. In 2009, Sahba moved to UNICEF Mozambique, where he became the Head of the Communication, Advocacy, Partnerships and Participation (CAPP) Section, managing public and media relations, children and youth participation, and communication for development activities. Subsequently, in 2014, Sahba took on his UNEP role in Nairobi, Kenya, as the Director of the Global Division of Communication, where he led communication, digital, and brand strategy for the organization. Major UN initiatives that his teams delivered include World Environment Day, Champions of the Earth, the Wild for Life Campaign, and the Big Picture campaign (between IMAX and UNEP's Goodwill Ambassadors program).

Since 2020, Sahba has been stationed in the United States, serving as the Manager of Global Engagement and Partnerships at the World Bank until 2023, before pursuing his current role as the Director of Global Communication and Advocacy at UNICEF. At the World Bank, Sahba was responsible for global strategies and teams engaging with civil society, private sector, and parliamentary stakeholders. He oversaw the Connect for Climate trust fund, and public-facing advocacy initiatives including at the Bank's Spring and Annual Meetings. At UNICEF, Sahba now provides strategic oversight and guidance to support the global positioning of UNICEF as a key partner to deliver results for children worldwide. Sahba establishes communication and advocacy priorities, oversees media, digital, and content strategy, and advises on internal and external engagement, including with staff, partners, and youth.

== Personal life ==
Sahba is the son of architect Fariborz Sahba and Golnar Sahba (née Rafi’i), and brother to OfficeSpace Software CEO, Shamim Sahba, and to painter, Shirin Sahba. Sahba is a member of the Baháʼí Faith.
