= Vaccine shedding =

Viral shedding from a vaccine-induced infection

Vaccine shedding is a form of viral shedding which can occasionally occur following a viral infection caused by an attenuated (or "live virus") vaccine. Illness in others resulting from transmission through this type of viral shedding is rare. The idea of shedding is a popular anti-vaccination myth. However, most vaccines are not attenuated (live virus) vaccines, and therefore cannot cause vaccine-induced viral shedding.

The specific use of the term "vaccine shedding" has risen to public prominence through anti-vaccine activists linked to misinformation related to COVID-19, who erroneously claim that COVID-19 vaccination can cause individuals to shed coronavirus spike protein and affect menstruation and fertility in women exposed to them. However, the spike protein generated by vaccination does not shed, and there is no evidence to suggest that these vaccines cause menstruation and fertility problems. Vaccination also cannot cause shedding of the COVID-19 virus since none of the COVID-19 vaccines authorized for use by the FDA or the World Health Organization as of December 2021 are live-virus vaccines. Despite this, a COVID-19 "vaccine shedding" conspiracy theory has subsequently emerged, leading to vaccine hesitancy among some people.

Shedding is only possible with an attenuated vaccine. It is impossible with other vaccine technologies such as inactivated vaccine (killed-virus vaccines), viral vector vaccine, RNA vaccines (that contain no virus), or subunit vaccines (a vaccine technology using only isolated proteins of a virus). Only a small number of vaccines use technology that contain live virus which can theoretically infect others.

With the exception of the oral polio vaccine (OPV), there have been no documented cases of vaccine-induced viral shedding that has infected contacts of a person vaccinated with an attenuated (live-virus) vaccine.

== Occurrences ==
The only human vaccine to have caused any significant number of infections is the oral polio vaccine (OPV), which takes advantage of the contact immunity from shed vaccine virus to amplify the effectiveness of vaccination campaigns. However, under conditions of persistent circulation in undervaccinated populations, reversion mutations that reactivate the virus can give rise to disease-causing circulating vaccine-derived poliovirus (cVDPV) strains, and this vaccine is no longer used in developed countries. However, the OPV is still used in Asia and Africa, leading to a small number of vaccine-induced polio infections each year.

The route of infection is through contact with faeces, and some live vaccines, like the viruses they prevent, are shed in stool for up to 28 days. Normal hygiene is sufficient to prevent infection among healthy individuals, but immunocompromised individuals need to be especially diligent.

Other attenuated vaccines show no significant viral shedding, and inadvertent infection is rare. For example, only eleven cases of chickenpox transmission by vaccinated individuals have been documented out of approximately fifty million doses, and but a single documented case of influenza virus transmission, and that person remained asymptomatic.

The attenuated virus from vaccines is much weaker and less likely to infect than the wild virus.

In dogs, vaccine-induced viral shedding has been observed with live attenuated Canine parvovirus vaccines.

== Research ==
Regulatory authorities in the US and EU recommend that shedding data should be collected both during the development phase and clinical trials of a relevant product, such as gene therapy. A full report on shedding must subsequently be included in the Biologics license application.

A study of 345 participants aged 5–49 years who received the live influenza virus vaccine LAIV3, and for whom shedding was assessed by viral culture of nasal swabs (daily for days 1–7 post vaccination, every other day for days 9 through 25, and on day 28) indicated that 30 percent had detectable virus in nasal secretions obtained by nasal swabbing. In an open-label study of 200 children aged 6–59 months who received a single dose of LAIV3, shedding of low titers of at least one vaccine virus was detected on culture in 79 percent of children and was more common among the younger recipients. Serious illnesses have not been reported among unvaccinated persons infected inadvertently with vaccine viruses. The estimated probability of transmission of vaccine virus within a contact group with a single LAIV recipient in this population was 0.58 percent.
