= Global Polio Eradication Initiative =

Initiative to eradicate polio

Global Polio Eradication Initiative (GPEI)
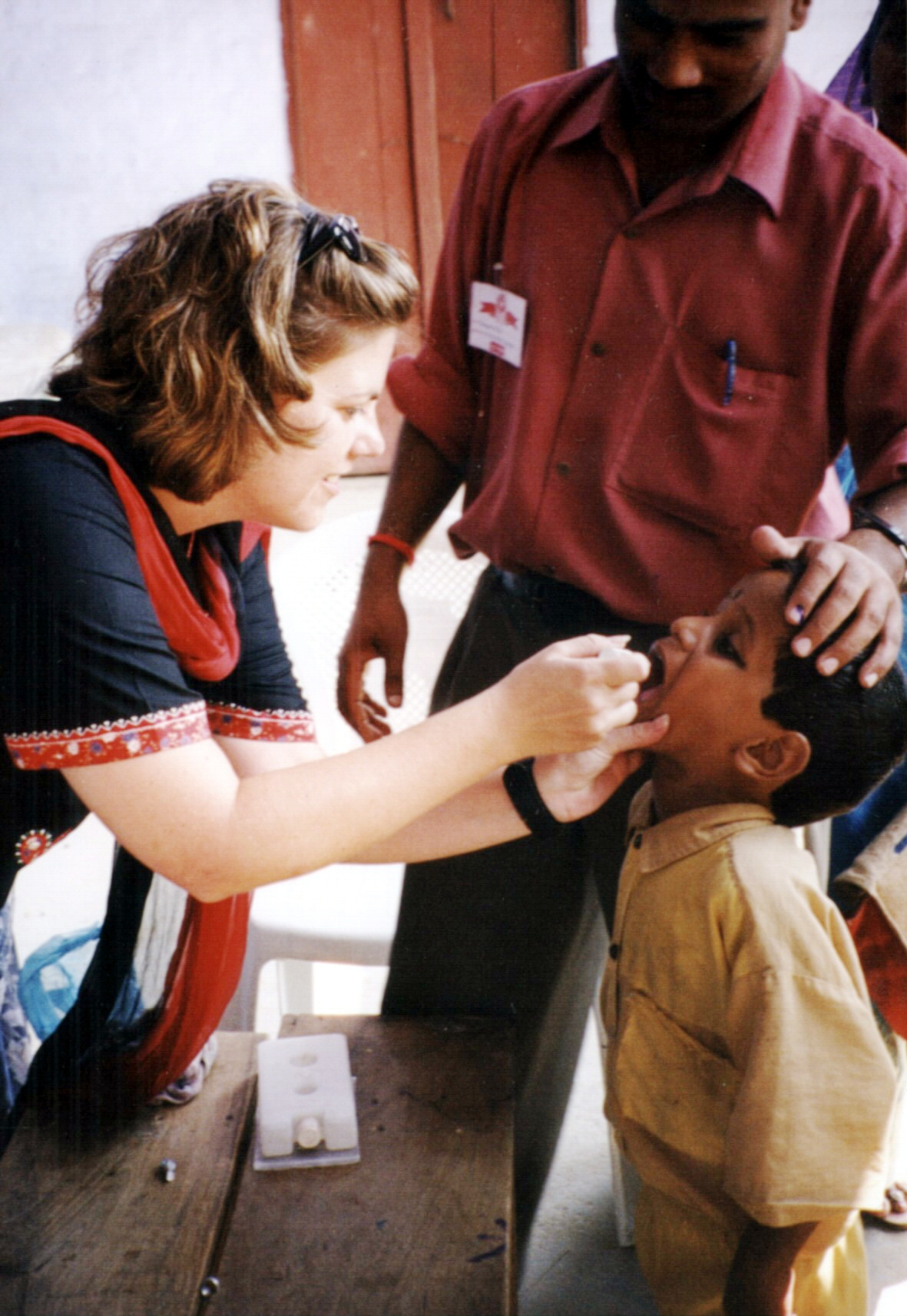
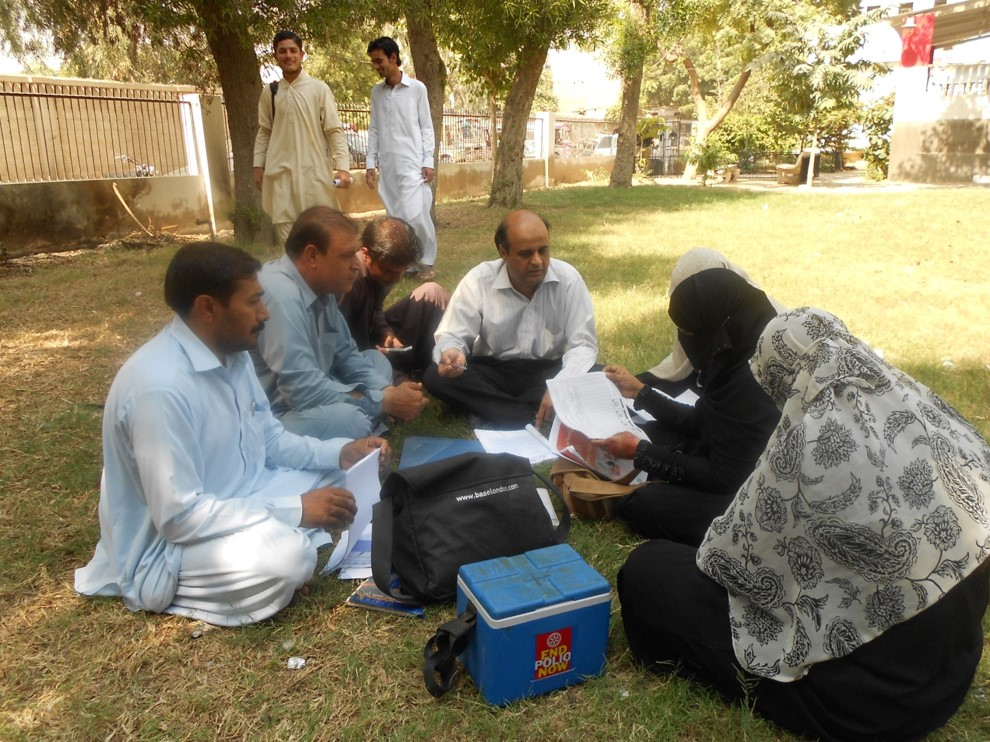
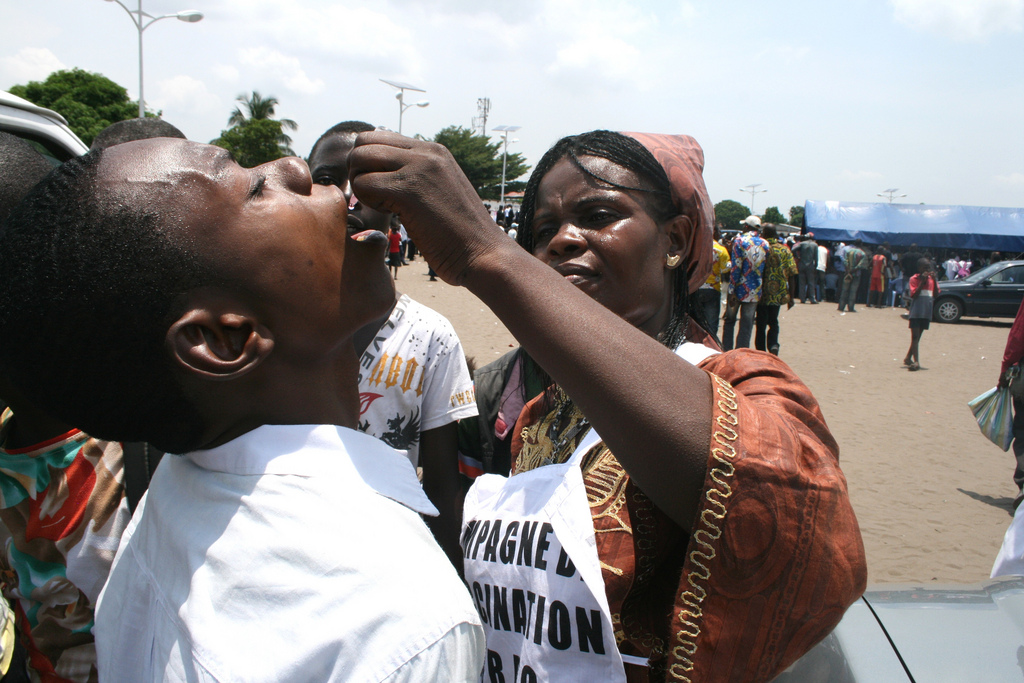
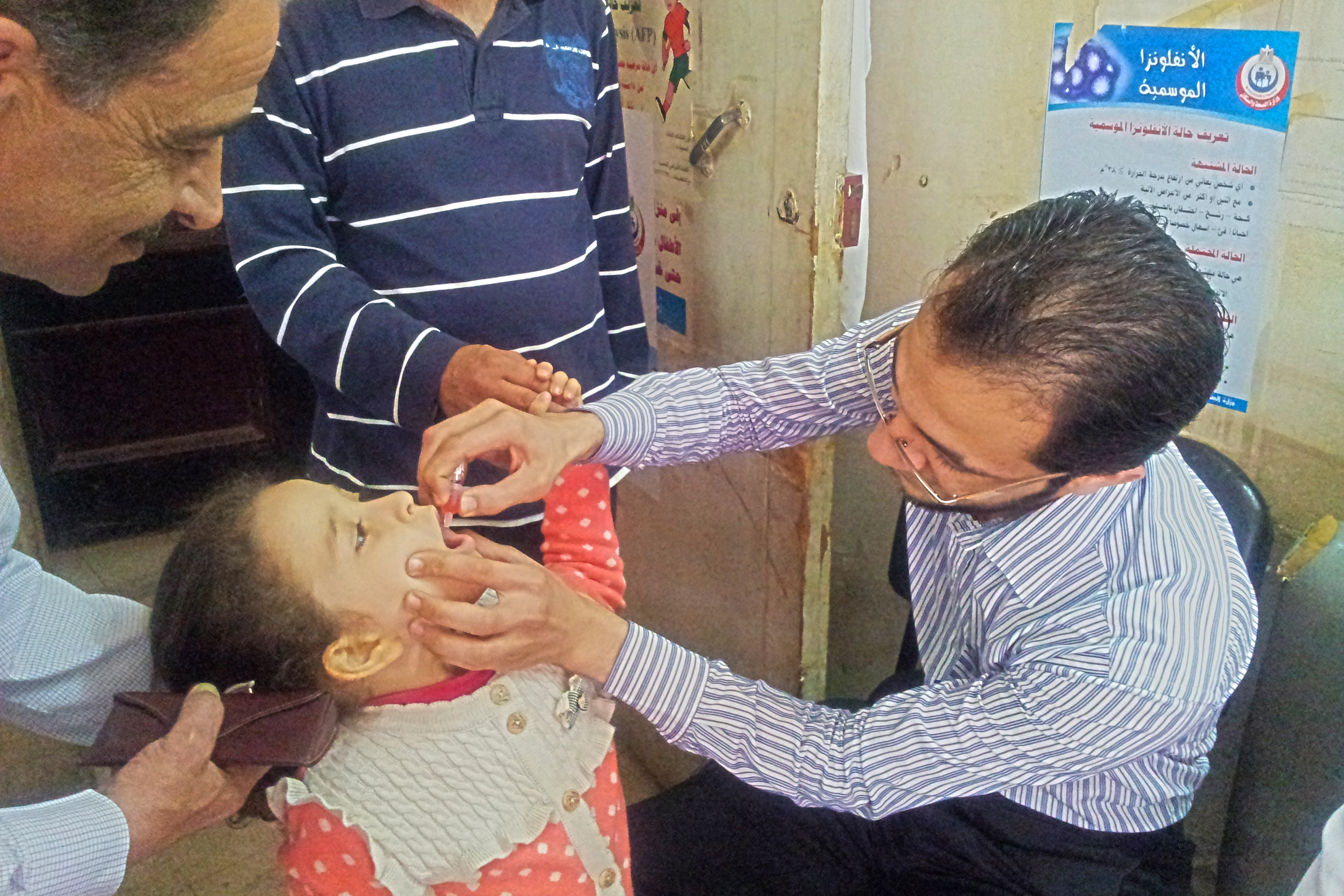
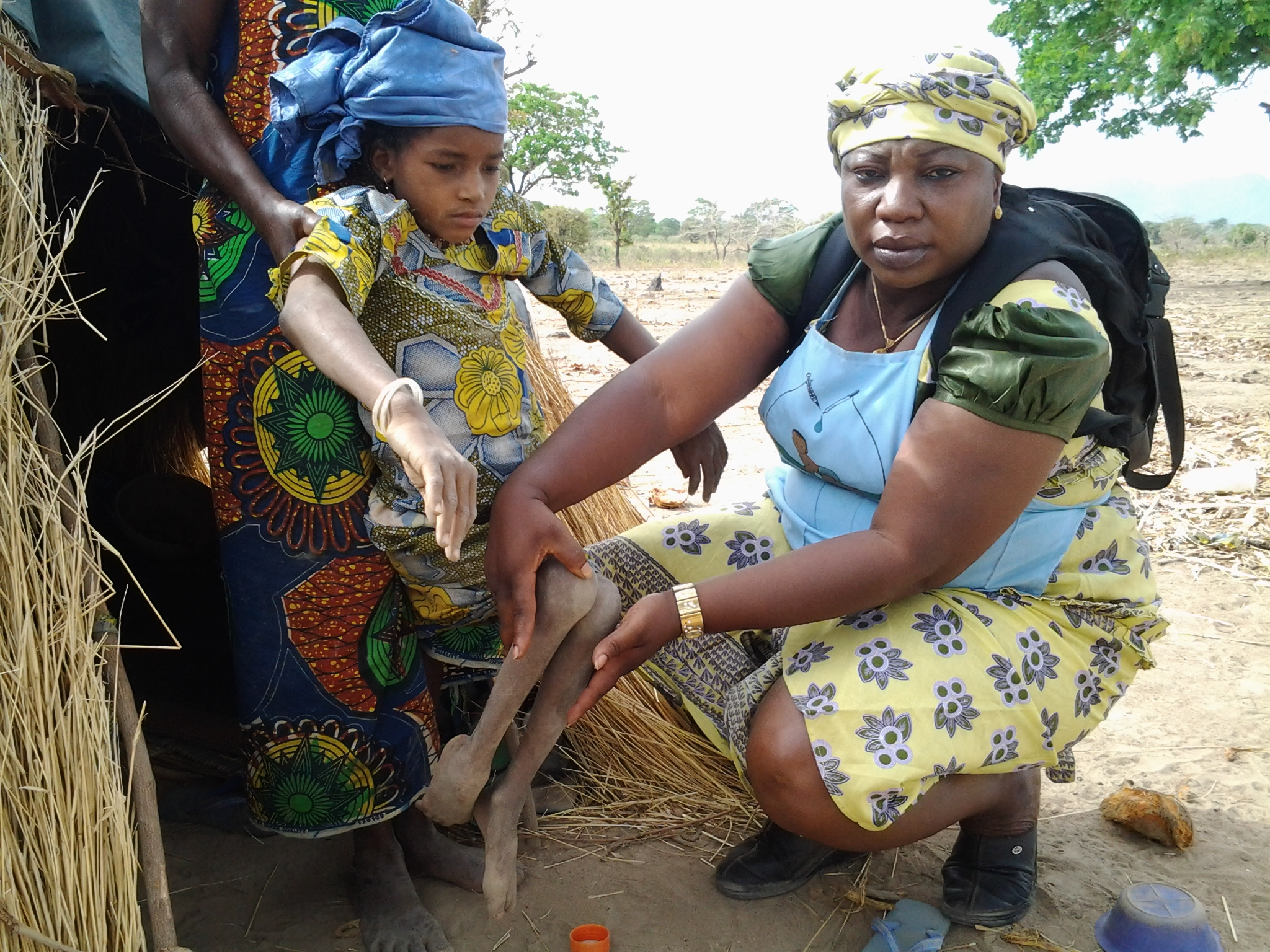
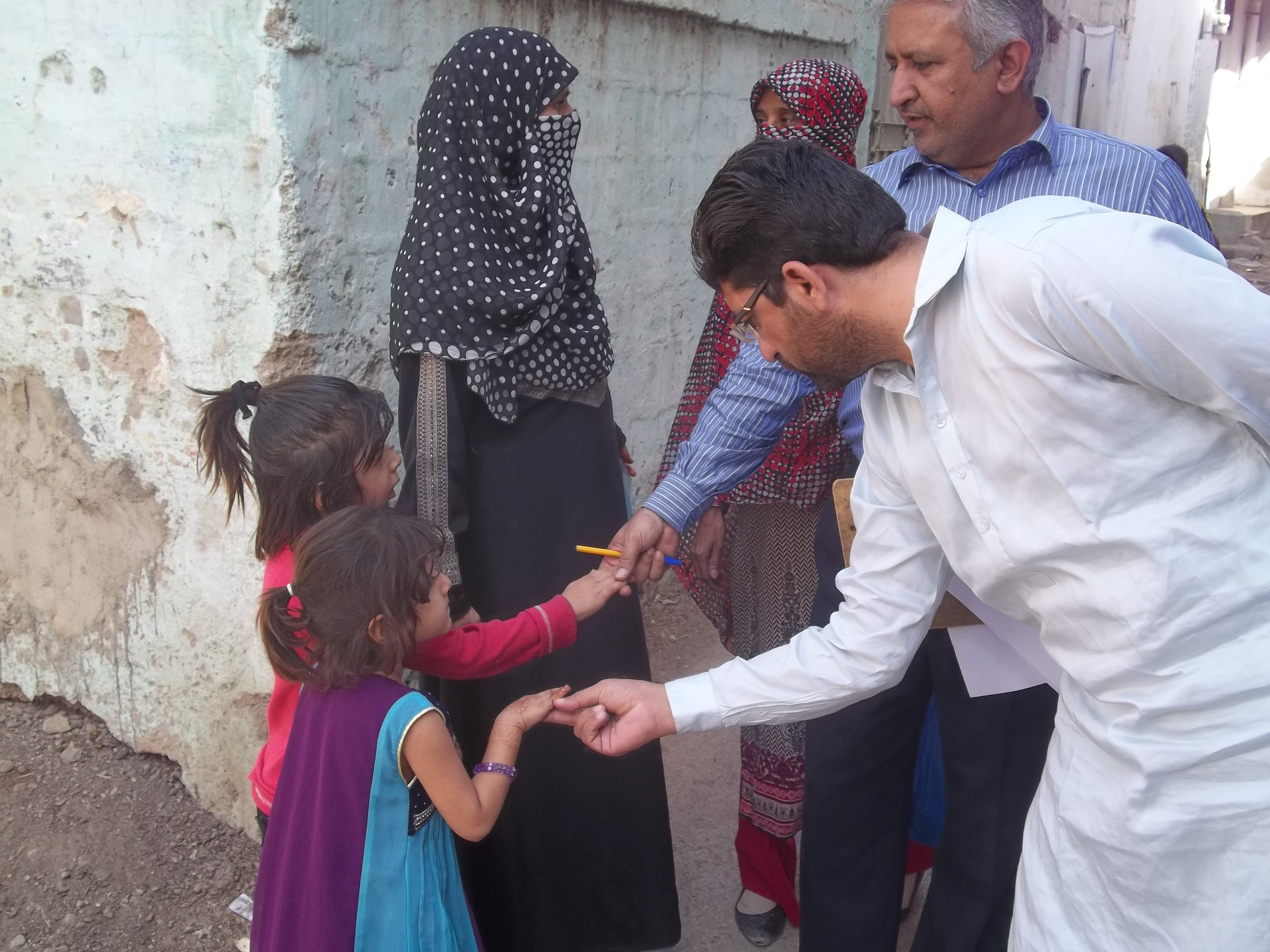
- text: GPEI, from top left to right: polio vaccination in India (2002), a morning briefing on how to vaccinate children in Pakistan, polio vaccine in the DRC, polio vaccination in Egypt, polio sequelle, checking for polio vaccination marks in Pakistan, bear in mind the live OPV vaccine taken orally confers protection to unvaccinated but may in rare cases cause vaccine-derived polio if populations are not sufficiently immunized.
- Country: Worldwide
- Launched: 1988
- Website: Official website

The Global Polio Eradication Initiative is an initiative created in 1988, just after the World Health Assembly resolved to eradicate the disease poliomyelitis. Led by the World Health Organization, it is the largest international public health initiative in history.

== History ==
In 1987 Rotary International began a campaign to raise U.S. $100 million by its 100th anniversary, for the purpose of dealing with global polio. The following year, the World Health Assembly voted for the Global Polio Eradication Initiative. At the time, there were 125 countries with endemic polio. Efforts were built upon those used to control wild poliovirus in the Americas in the early 1980s, and on lessons from smallpox eradication. Its first coordinator was Nick Ward.

== Strategy and structure ==
The strategy for the eradication of polio rests on immunising every at-risk child until there is no one left for the disease to transmit to, and the disease eventually dies out.

The initiative is spearheaded by the following organisations in the form of multistakeholder governance:

- WHO (World Health Organization), who are responsible for planning, technical direction, surveillance and eradication certification
- Rotary International, whose responsibilities include fundraising, advocacy, and volunteer recruitment
- The CDC, who are in charge of deploying scientists and public health experts to WHO and UNICEF
- UNICEF is in charge of the distribution of the vaccine and helping countries develop communication and awareness strategies.
- The Gates Foundation provided a large portion of the funding.

Key tactics used by the GPEI include strengthening childhood immunisation through oral vaccines, conducting surveillance through investigation of acute flaccid paralysis cases among children under 15 years old (in order to determine areas where the virus is truly eradicated), and conducting "mop up" campaigns in areas where cases of polio have been identified.

== Funding ==
At the peak of its work, the programme directly employed 4000 people across 75 countries and managed a budget of nearly U.S. $1 billion.

As of 2021, the GPEI had raised 18 billion dollars in funding, with annual contributions around 800 million to 1 billion dollars. Around 30% of the funding came from the Gates Foundation 30% from developed governments, 27% from countries at risk of polio, and the rest was made up of donations from nonprofits, private funders, and other foundations.

The EIB funded €500 million to the Global Polio Eradication Initiative in 2023. This is part of a new initiative along with the European Commission, the European Investment Bank and the Bill & Melinda Gates Foundation, meant to cover polio immunisations for around 370 million children yearly, provide measles vaccines, and build health systems to adapt to other health risks.

== Evaluation ==
In 1995 the Global Certification Commission was created to oversee the certification of the eradication of wild-type poliovirus transmissions. Certification for the six WHO regions requires all of the countries in that region to be certified by the commission. By 2000, both the regions of the Western Pacific and the Americas met the criteria to be certified free of polio transmissions. By 2012 the initial number of estimated cases in 1988 of 350,000 across 125 endemic countries had dropped to 650 confirmed cases. As of 2020, five of the six WHO regions are now certified polio-eradicated (Europe, the Americas, Africa, South-East Asian, and Western Pacific Region). India was certified polio-free in 2014, and Africa was declared polio free in 2020. The only countries with endemic polio were Afghanistan and Pakistan as of 2021.

== See also ==
- Eradication of infectious diseases
- The Final Inch, a short documentary about the effort to eradicate polio
- List of diseases eliminated from the United States
