= Polio eradication =

Effort to permanently eliminate all cases of poliomyelitis infection

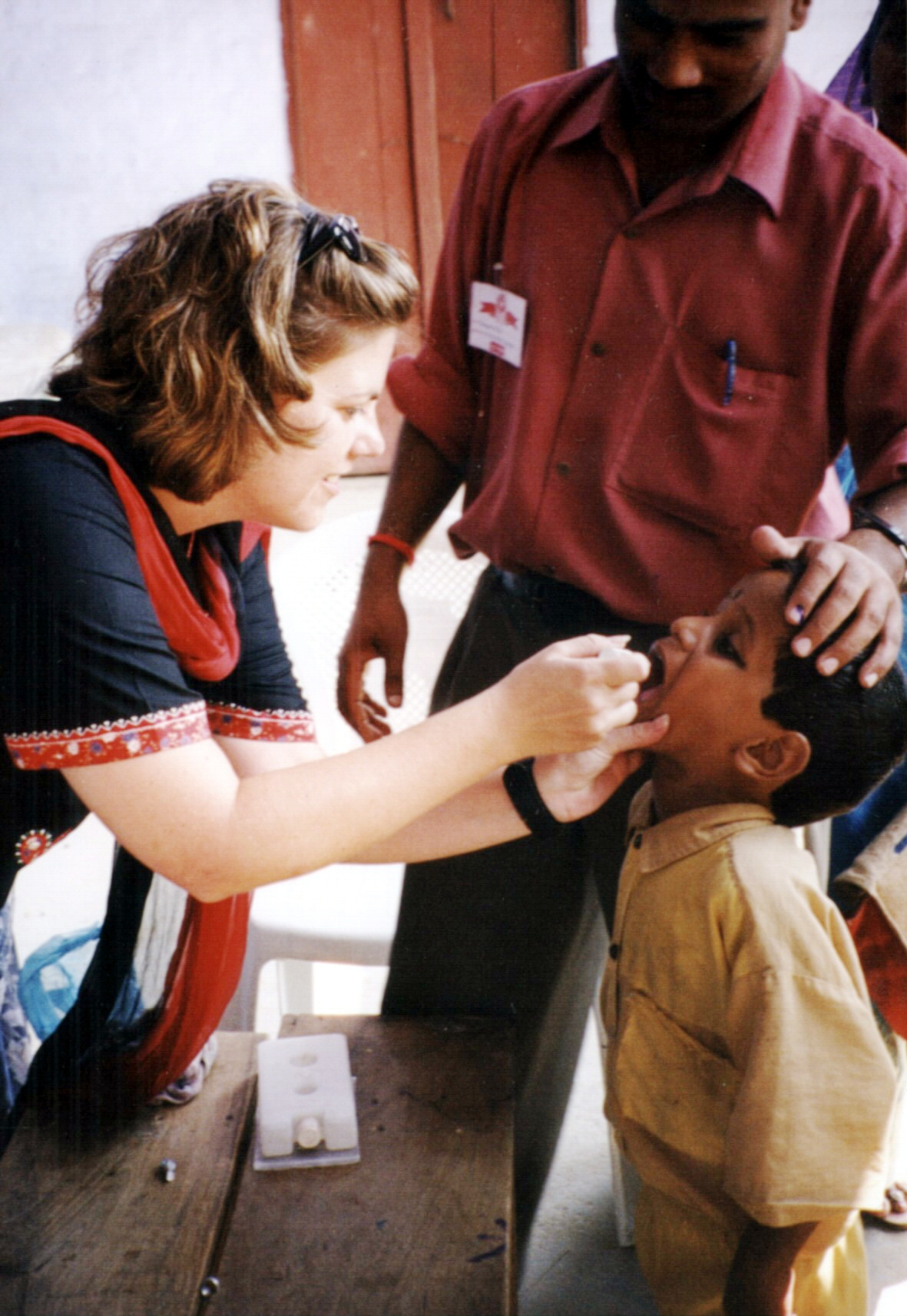
A child receives oral polio vaccine during a 2002 campaign to immunize children in India.

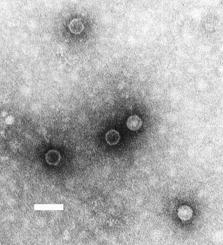
Poliovirus

Polio eradication, the goal of permanent global cessation of circulation of the poliovirus and hence elimination of the poliomyelitis (polio) it causes, is the aim of a multinational public health effort begun in 1988, led by the World Health Organization (WHO), the United Nations Children's Fund (UNICEF) and the Rotary Foundation. These organizations, along with the U.S. Centers for Disease Control and Prevention (CDC) and The Gates Foundation, have spearheaded the campaign through the Global Polio Eradication Initiative (GPEI). Successful eradication of infectious diseases has been achieved twice before, with smallpox in humans and rinderpest in ruminants.

Prevention of disease spread is accomplished by vaccination. There are two kinds of polio vaccine—oral polio vaccine (OPV), which uses weakened poliovirus, and inactivated polio vaccine (IPV), which is injected. OPV is less expensive and easier to administer, and can spread immunity beyond the person vaccinated, creating contact immunity. It has been the predominant vaccine used. However, under conditions of long-term vaccine virus circulation in under-vaccinated populations, mutations can reactivate the virus to produce a polio-inducing strain, while OPV can also, in rare circumstances, induce polio or persistent asymptomatic infection in vaccinated individuals, particularly those who are immunodeficient. IPV, being inactivated, does not carry these risks, but does not induce contact immunity. IPV is more costly and the logistics of its delivery are more challenging.

Nigeria is the latest country to have officially stopped endemic transmission of wild poliovirus, with its last reported case in 2016. Of the three strains of WPV, the last recorded wild case caused by type 2 (WPV2) was in 1999, and WPV2 was declared eradicated in 2015. Type 3 (WPV3) is last known to have caused polio in 2012, and was declared eradicated in 2019. All wild-virus cases since that date have been due to type 1 (WPV1).

Currently, Afghanistan and Pakistan are the only two countries where the disease is still classified as endemic. Recent polio cases arise from two sources, the original "wild" poliovirus (WPV), and the much more prevalent mutated oral vaccine strains, known as circulating vaccine-derived poliovirus (cVDPV) or variant poliovirus. Vaccines against each of the three wild strains of polio have given rise to strains of cVDPV, with cVDPV2 being most prominent. cVDPV caused 312 confirmed paralytic polio cases worldwide in 2024, and was detected in 21 countries.

== Factors influencing eradication of polio ==
Eradication of polio has been defined in various ways:

1. As elimination of the occurrence of poliomyelitis even in the absence of human intervention.
2. As extinction of poliovirus, such that the infectious agent no longer exists in nature or in the laboratory.
3. As control of an infection to the point at which transmission of the disease ceased within a specified area.
4. As reduction of the worldwide incidence of poliomyelitis to zero as a result of deliberate efforts, and requiring no further control measures.

In theory, if the right tools were available, it would be possible to eradicate all infectious diseases that reside only in a human host. In reality, there are distinct biological features of the organisms and technical factors of dealing with them that make their potential eradicability more or less likely. Three indicators, however, are considered of primary importance in determining the likelihood of successful eradication: that effective interventional tools are available to interrupt transmission of the agent, such as a vaccine; that diagnostic tools, with sufficient sensitivity and specificity, be available to detect infections that can lead to transmission of the disease; and that humans are required for the life-cycle of the agent, which has no other vertebrate reservoir and cannot amplify in the environment.

=== Strategy ===
The most important step in eradication of polio is interruption of endemic transmission of poliovirus. Stopping polio transmission has been pursued through a combination of routine immunization, supplementary immunization campaigns, and surveillance of possible outbreaks. Several key strategies have been outlined for stopping polio transmission:

1. High infant immunization coverage with four doses of oral polio vaccine (OPV) in the first year of life in developing and endemic countries, and routine immunization with OPV or IPV elsewhere.
2. Organization of "national immunization days" to provide supplementary doses of oral polio vaccine to all children less than five years old.
3. Active surveillance for poliovirus through reporting and laboratory testing of all cases of acute flaccid paralysis. Acute flaccid paralysis (AFP) is a clinical manifestation of poliomyelitis characterized by weakness or paralysis and reduced muscle tone without other obvious cause (e.g., trauma) among children less than fifteen years old. Other pathogenic agents can also cause AFP, such as enteroviruses, echoviruses, and adenoviruses.
4. Expanded environmental surveillance to detect the presence of poliovirus in communities. Sewage samples are collected at regular and random sites and tested in laboratories for the presence of WPV or cVDPV. Since most polio infections are asymptomatic, transmission can occur in spite of the absence of polio-related AFP cases, and such monitoring helps to evaluate the degree to which virus continues to circulate in an area.
5. Targeted "mop-up" campaigns once poliovirus transmission is limited to specific geographical foci.

=== Vaccination ===
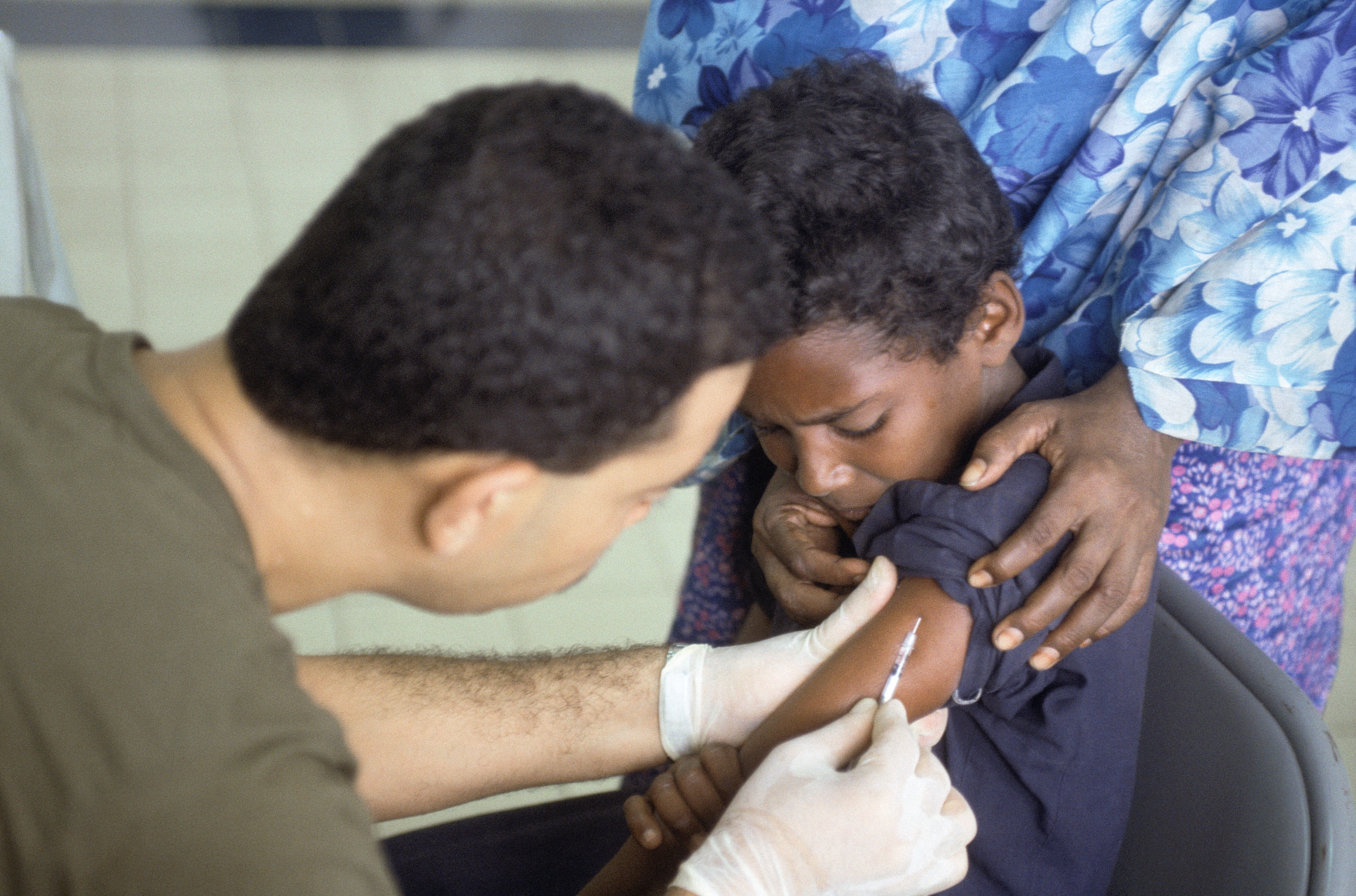
Somali boy receiving injection of inactivated polio vaccine (IPV)

There are two distinct types of polio vaccine. Oral polio vaccine (OPV, or Sabin vaccine) contains attenuated poliovirus. OPV is delivered as oral drops or infused into sugar cubes. It is highly effective and inexpensive (about US$0.15 to 0.20 per dose in 2024) and its availability has bolstered efforts to eradicate polio. The vaccine confers long-term, possibly lifelong, immunity to the virus. Because of its route of administration, it induces an immunization of the intestinal mucosa that protects against subsequent infection, though multiple doses are necessary to achieve effective prophylaxis. Attenuated poliovirus derived from the oral polio vaccine is excreted, infecting and indirectly inducing immunity in unvaccinated individuals, and thus amplifying the effects of the doses delivered. The oral administration does not require special medical equipment or training. Taken together, these advantages have made it the favored vaccine of many countries, and it has long been preferred by the global eradication initiative.

The primary disadvantage of OPV derives from its inherent nature. As an attenuated but active virus, it can induce vaccine-associated paralytic poliomyelitis (VAPP) in approximately one individual per every 2.7 million doses administered. The live virus can circulate in under-vaccinated populations (circulating vaccine-derived poliovirus, cVDPV) and over time can mutate to a neurovirulent form causing paralytic polio. Until recent times, a trivalent OPV containing all three virus strains was used, but with the eradication of wild poliovirus type 2 this was phased out in 2016 and replaced with bivalent vaccine containing just types 1 and 3, supplemented with monovalent type 2 OPV in regions with documented cVDPV2 circulation. A novel OPV2 vaccine (nOPV2) genetically modified to reduce the likelihood of disease-causing activating mutations was granted emergency licencing in 2021, and subsequently full licensure in December 2023. Genetically stabilsed vaccines targeting poliovirus types 1 and 3 are in development, with the intention that these will eventually completely replace the Sabin vaccines.

The inactivated polio vaccine (IPV, or Salk) contains trivalent fully inactivated virus, administered by injection. This vaccine cannot induce VAPP nor do cVDPV strains arise from it, but it likewise cannot induce contact immunity and thus must be administered to every individual. Added to this are greater logistical challenges. Though a single dose is sufficient for protection, administration requires medically trained vaccinators armed with single-use needles and syringes. Taken together, these factors result in substantially higher delivery costs. Original protocols involved intramuscular injection in the arm or leg, but recently subcutaneous injection using a lower dose (so-called fractional-dose IPV, fIPV) has been found to be effective, lowering costs and also allowing for more convenient and cost-effective delivery systems. The use of IPV results in serum immunity, but no intestinal immunity arises. As a consequence, vaccinated individuals are protected from contracting polio, but their intestinal mucosa may still be infected and serve as a reservoir for the excretion of live virus. For this reason, IPV is ineffective at halting ongoing outbreaks of WPV or cVDPV, but it has become the vaccine of choice for industrialized, polio-free countries.

While IPV does not itself induce mucosal immunity, it has been shown to boost the mucosal immunity from OPV, and the WHO now favors a combined protocol. It is recommended that vulnerable children receive a dose of OPV at birth, then beginning at the age of six weeks a 'primary series' consisting of three OPV doses at least four weeks apart, along with one dose of IPV after 14 weeks. This combined IPV/OPV approach has also been used in outbreak suppression.

==== Herd immunity ====
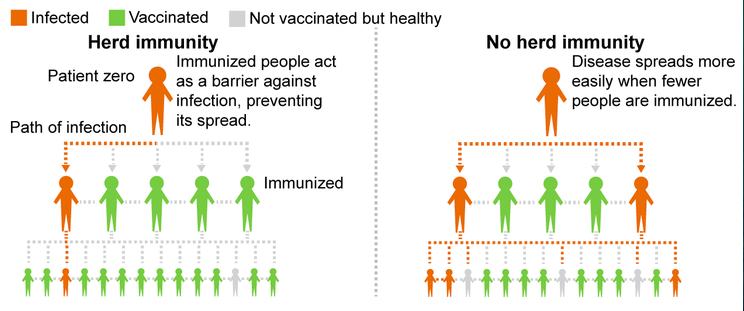
Herd Immunity vs Without Herd Immunity

Polio vaccination is also important in the development of herd immunity. For polio to occur in a population, there must be an infecting organism (poliovirus), a susceptible human population, and a cycle of transmission. There is no animal reservoir for poliovirus, and the transmission cycle of polio is from one infected person to another person susceptible to the disease, usually through the fecal-oral route. If the vast majority of the population is immune to a particular agent, the ability of that pathogen to infect another host is reduced; the cycle of transmission is interrupted, and the pathogen cannot reproduce and dies out. This concept, called community immunity or herd immunity, is important to disease eradication, because it means that it is not necessary to inoculate 100% of the population—a goal that is often logistically very difficult—to achieve the desired result. If the number of susceptible individuals can be reduced to a sufficiently small number through vaccination, then the pathogen will eventually die off.

Herd immunity is an important supplement to vaccination. According to the concept of herd immunity, the population for whom the vaccine fails is still protected by the immunity of those around them, and it can only be achieved when vaccination levels are high. It is estimated that the minimum herd immunity threshold for poliovirus eradication ranges from approximately 75% in wealthy high-hygiene populations to 97% in poorer environments. If routine immunization were to be stopped, the number of unvaccinated, susceptible individuals would soon exceed the capability of herd immunity to protect them.

==== Vaccine-derived poliovirus ====
Number of wild poliovirus cases, 1975–2024
(before 2000 may include small numbers of cVDPV cases)

Number of cVDPV cases, 2000–2024

While vaccination has played an instrumental role in the reduction of polio cases worldwide, the use of attenuated virus in the oral vaccine carries with it an inherent risk. The oral vaccine is a powerful tool in fighting polio in part because of its person-to-person transmission and resulting contact immunity. However, under conditions of long-term circulation in undervaccinated populations, the virus can accumulate mutations that reverse the attenuation and result in vaccine virus strains that themselves cause polio. As a result of such circulating vaccine-derived poliovirus (cVDPV) strains, polio outbreaks have periodically recurred in regions that have long been free of the wild virus, but where vaccination rates have fallen. Oral vaccines can also give rise to persistent infection in immunodeficient individuals, with the virus eventually mutating into a more virulent immunodeficiency-associated vaccine-derived poliovirus (iVDPV). In particular, the type 2 strain seems prone to reversions, so in 2016 the eradication effort abandoned the trivalent oral vaccine containing attenuated strains of all three virus types and replaced it with a bivalent oral vaccine lacking the type 2 virus, while a separate monovalent type 2 vaccine (mOPV2) was to be used only to target existing cVDPV2 outbreaks. A novel oral vaccine targeting type 2 (nOPV2) that has been genetically stabilized to make it less prone to give rise to circulating vaccine-derived strains received full licensure in December 2023, with similar vaccines targeting types 1 and 3 undergoing clinical trials. Eradication efforts will eventually require all oral vaccination to be discontinued in favor of the use of injectable vaccines. These vaccines are more expensive and more difficult to deliver, and they lack the ability to induce contact immunity because they contain only killed virus, but they likewise are incapable of giving rise to vaccine-derived viral strains.

=== Surveillance ===
A global program of surveillance for the presence of polio and the poliovirus plays a critical role in assessment of eradication and in outbreak detection and response. Two distinct methods are used in tandem: acute flaccid paralysis (AFP) surveillance and environmental surveillance.

Monitoring for AFP aims at identifying outbreaks of polio by screening patients displaying symptoms consistent with, but not exclusive to, severe poliovirus infection. Stool samples are collected from children presenting with AFP and evaluated for the presence of poliovirus by accredited laboratories in the Global Polio Laboratory Network. Since rates of non-polio AFP are expected to be constant and large compared to the number of polio cases, the frequency of non-polio AFP reported in a population is indicative of the effectiveness of surveillance, as is the proportion of AFP patients from whom high-quality stool samples are collected and tested, with a target of at least 80%.

Environmental surveillance is used to supplement AFP surveillance. This entails the routine testing of sewage samples for the presence of virus, which not only allows the effectiveness of vaccination efforts to be evaluated in countries with active transmission, but also allows the detection of new outbreaks in countries without known transmission. In 2018, the GPEI conducted environmental surveillance in 44 countries, 24 of which are in Africa.

=== Obstacles ===
Among the greatest obstacles to global polio eradication are the lack of basic health infrastructure, which limits vaccine distribution and delivery, the crippling effects of civil war and internal strife, and the sometimes oppositional stance that marginalized communities take against what is perceived as a potentially hostile intervention by outsiders. Another challenge has been maintaining the potency of live (attenuated) vaccines in extremely hot or remote areas. The oral polio vaccine must be kept at 2 to 8 °C (36 to 46 °F) for vaccination to be successful.

An independent evaluation of obstacles to polio eradication requested by the WHO and conducted in 2009 considered the major obstacles in detail by country. In Afghanistan and Pakistan, the researchers concluded that the most significant barrier was insecurity, but that managing human resources, political pressures, the movement of large populations between and within both countries, and inadequately resourced health facilities also posed problems, as did technical issues with the vaccine. In India, the major challenge appeared to be the high efficiency of transmission within the populations of Bihar and Uttar Pradesh states, set against the low (~80% after three doses against type 1) seroconversion response seen from the vaccine. In Nigeria, the most critical barriers identified were management issues, in particular the highly variable importance ascribed to polio by different authorities at the local government level, although funding issues, community perceptions of vaccine safety, inadequate mobilisation of community groups, and issues with the cold chain also played a role. In those countries where international spread from endemic countries had resulted in the reestablishment of transmission, namely Angola, Chad, and South Sudan, the key issues identified were underdeveloped health systems and low routine vaccine coverage, although the low level of resources committed to Angola and South Sudan for the purpose of curtailing the spread of polio and climatic factors was also identified as playing a role.

Two additional challenges are found in unobserved polio transmission and in vaccine-derived poliovirus. First, most individuals infected with poliovirus are asymptomatic or exhibit minor symptoms, with fewer than 1% of infections leading to paralysis, and most infected people are unaware that they carry the disease, allowing polio to spread widely before cases are seen. In 2000, using new screening techniques for the molecular characterization of outbreak viral strains, it was discovered that some of the outbreaks were actually caused by circulating vaccine-derived poliovirus, following mutations or recombinations in the attenuated strain used for the oral polio vaccine. This discovery altered the strategy for the discontinuation of vaccination following polio eradication, necessitating an eventual switch to the more expensive and logistically more problematic inactivated polio vaccine, as continued use of the oral inactivated virus would continue to produce such revertant infection-causing strains. The risk of vaccine-derived polio will persist long after the switch to inactivated vaccine, as a small number of chronic excretors continue to produce active virus for years (or even decades) after their initial exposure to the oral vaccine.

In a 2012 interview with Pakistani newspaper Dawn, Dr. Hussain A. Gezari, the WHO's special envoy on global polio eradication and primary healthcare, gave his views on obstacles to eradication. He said that the biggest hurdle preventing Pakistan from becoming polio-free was holding district health officials properly accountable—in national eradication campaigns officials had hired their own relatives, even young children. Gezari asked, "How do you expect a seven-year-old thumb-sucking kid to implement a polio campaign of the government?" and added that, in spite of this, "the first national campaign was initiated by your government in 1994 and that year Pakistan reported 25,000 polio cases, and the number was just 198 last year, which clearly shows that the programme is working."

==== Opposition to vaccination efforts ====
One factor contributing to the continued circulation of polio immunization programs has been opposition to vaccination in some countries. In one country, Pakistan, "more than 200 polio team workers" have been killed (team members include not only vaccinators but police and security personnel) from "targeted killing and terrorism" while working on polio campaigns (the killers motivated by the belief, spread by "radical clerics", that the vaccine is part of "a Western plot to sterilize Muslims").

In the context of the United States invasion of Afghanistan and the subsequent 2003 invasion of Iraq, rumours arose in the Muslim world that immunization campaigns were using intentionally-contaminated vaccines to sterilize local Muslim populations or to infect them with HIV. In Nigeria these rumours fit in with a longstanding suspicion of modern biomedicine, which since its introduction during the era of colonialism has been viewed as a projection of the power of western nations. Even before the implementation of the Global Polio Eradication Initiative, many Nigerians believed that the EPI vaccine contained fertility control drugs. Refusal of vaccination came to be viewed as resistance to western expansionism, and when the contamination rumours led the Nigerian Supreme Council for Sharia to call for a region-wide boycott of polio vaccination, polio cases in the country increased more than five-fold between 2002 and 2006, with the uncontrolled virus then spreading across Africa and globally. In Afghanistan and Pakistan, fears that the vaccine contained contraceptives were one reason given by the Taliban in issuing fatwas against polio vaccination. Religious boycotts based on contamination concerns have not been limited to the Muslim world. In 2015, after claiming that a tetanus vaccine contained a contraceptive, a group of Kenyan Catholic bishops called on their followers to boycott a planned round of polio vaccination. This did not have a major effect on vaccination rates, and dialog along with vaccine testing forestalled further boycott calls.

Other religion-inspired refusals arise from concern over whether the virus contains pig-derived products, and hence are haram (forbidden) in Islam, concern that vaccine production may have involved a prohibited taking of animal life, or a resistance to interfering with disease processes perceived to be divinely-directed. Concerns were addressed through extensive outreach, directed both toward the communities involved and respected clerical bodies, as well as promoting local ownership of the eradication campaign in each region. In early 2012, some parents refused to get their children vaccinated in Khyber Pakhtunkhwa (KPK) and in the Federally Administered Tribal Areas (FATA) but religious refusals in the rest of the country had "decreased manifold". Even with the express support of political leaders, polio workers or their accompanying security guards have been kidnapped, beaten, or assassinated.

Skepticism in the Muslim world was exacerbated when it was learned that in 2011 the Central Intelligence Agency (CIA) had conducted a fake hepatitis B immunization campaign, hoping to collect blood samples from Osama bin Laden's compound in Abbottabad in order to confirm the genetic identity of the children living there, and by implication his own presence, leading directly to his killing. In a letter written to CIA director Leon Panetta, the InterAction Alliance, a union of about 200 U.S.-based non-government organizations, deplored the actions of the CIA in using a vaccination campaign as a cover. Pakistan reported the world's highest number of polio cases (198), in 2011. and more than 60 polio vaccination workers were killed between December 2012 and April 2014. In May 2014, CIA director John Brennan prohibited his agency both from using vaccinations to cover operations and from testing samples collected by authentic vaccination campaigns.

Polio vaccination efforts have also faced resistance in another form. The priority placed on vaccination by national authorities has turned it into a bargaining chip, with communities and interest groups resisting vaccination, not due to direct opposition, but to leverage other concessions from governmental authorities. In Nigeria this has taken the form of 'block rejection' of vaccination that is only resolved when state officials agree to repair or improve schools and health-care facilities, pave roads or install electricity. There have been several instances of threatened boycotts by health workers in Pakistan over payment disputes. Some governments have been accused of withholding vaccination or the necessary accompanying infrastructure from regions where opposition to their rule is high.

== Polio eradication criteria ==
A country is regarded as polio-free or non-endemic if no cases have been detected for a year. However, it is still possible for polio to circulate under these circumstances, as was the case for Nigeria, where a particular strain of virus resurfaced after five years in 2016. This can be due to chance, limited surveillance and under-vaccinated populations. Moreover, for WPV1—the only type of the virus which is currently circulating following the eradication of WPV2 and WPV3—only 1 in 200 infection cases exhibit symptoms of polio paralysis in non-vaccinated children. Therefore, even a single case is indicative of an epidemic.

Certification of wild poliovirus eradication requires three consecutive years without case reports, in the presence of reliable disease surveillance networks. Wild poliovirus type 2 was certified eradicated in 2015, the last case having been detected in 1999. Wild poliovirus type 3 has not been detected since 2012, and was certified eradicated in 2019.

== Post-eradication plans ==
Beginning at certification of complete WPV eradication, the post-certification strategy will come into effect, with program priorities shifting towards outbreak preparedness and containment of existing virus material rather than circulating disease. Vaccination for WPV1 will cease one year following eradication certification, and eradication of vaccine-derived poliovirus is then targeted for 2030.

Where possible, the number of facilities conducting operations with poliovirus is to be reduced significantly; and the use of wild poliovirus is to be abandoned altogether in favour of genetically stabilized attenuated strains where possible. As of May 2021, there are 74 designated Poliovirus Essential Facilities (PEFs) across 24 countries where work on poliovirus can be carried out. These facilities are currently involved in producing materials to assist the eradication initiative, and perform crucial research which may prevent future outbreaks. After certification, these facilities retain the equipment and materials to continue vaccine production in the event of deliberate or accidental release. Work on Poliovirus outside of the PEFs will be prohibited, and stocks in laboratories that are not designated as PEFs must either be transferred to a PEF or destroyed.

== Timeline ==
International wild poliovirus cases by year
Year	Estimated	Recorded
1975	—	49,293
...
1980	400,000	52,552
...
1985	—	38,637
...
1988	350,000	35,251
...
1990	—	23,484
...
1993	100,000	10,487
...
1995	—	7,035
...
2000	—	719
...
2005	—	1,979
...
2010	—	1,352
2011	—	650
2012	—	223
2013	—	416
2014	—	359
2015	—	74
2016	—	37
2017	—	22
2018	—	33
2019	—	176
2020	—	140
2021	—	6
2022	—	30
2023	—	12
2024	—	99
2025	—	51

=== 1950s–1987 ===
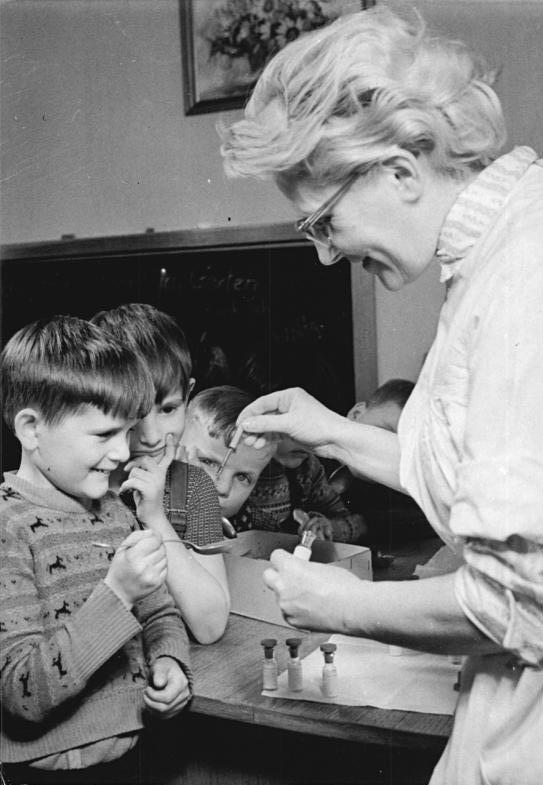
Kindergarten children receive a very early oral polio vaccine in 1960 in East Germany.

Following the widespread use of poliovirus vaccine in the mid-1950s, the incidence of poliomyelitis declined rapidly in many industrialized countries. Czechoslovakia became the first country in the world to scientifically demonstrate nationwide eradication of poliomyelitis in 1960. In 1962—just one year after Sabin's oral polio vaccine (OPV) was licensed in most industrialized countries—Cuba began using the oral vaccine in a series of nationwide polio campaigns. The early success of these mass vaccination campaigns suggested that polioviruses could be globally eradicated. The Pan American Health Organization (PAHO), under the leadership of Ciro de Quadros, launched an initiative to eradicate polio from the Americas in 1985.

Much of the work towards eradication was documented by Brazilian photographer Sebastião Salgado, as a UNICEF Goodwill Ambassador, in the book The End of Polio: Global Effort to End a Disease.

=== 1988–2000 ===
In 1988, the World Health Organization (WHO), together with Rotary International, UNICEF, and the U.S. Centers for Disease Control and Prevention (CDC) passed the Global Polio Eradication Initiative (GPEI), with the goal of eradicating polio by the year 2000. The initiative was inspired by Rotary International's 1985 pledge to raise $120 million toward immunising all of the world's children against the disease. The last case of wild poliovirus poliomyelitis in the Americas was reported in Peru, August 1991.

On 20 August 1994, the Americas were certified as polio-free. This achievement was a milestone in efforts to eradicate the disease.

In 1994, the Indian Government launched the Pulse Polio Campaign to eliminate polio. The campaign involves annual vaccination of all children ages 0–5.

In 1995, Operation MECACAR (Mediterranean, Caucasus, Central Asian Republics, and Russia) was launched; National Immunization Days were coordinated in 19 European and Mediterranean countries. In 1998, Melik Minas of Turkey became the last case of polio reported in Europe. In 1997, Mum Chanty of Cambodia became the last person to contract polio in the Indo-West Pacific region. In 2000, the Western Pacific Region (including China) was certified polio-free.

In October 1999, the last isolation of type 2 poliovirus occurred in India. This type of poliovirus was subsequently declared eradicated.

Also in October 1999, the CORE Group—with funding from the United States Agency for International Development (USAID)—launched its effort to support national eradication efforts at the grassroots level. The CORE Group commenced this initiative in Bangladesh, India, and Nepal in South Asia, and in Angola, Ethiopia, and Uganda in Africa.

=== 2001–2005 ===
Disability-adjusted life year for poliomyelitis per 100,000 inhabitants in 2004: no data <0.3 0.3–0.75 0.75–1.2 1.2–1.65 1.65–2.1 2.1–2.55 / 2.55–3 3–4 4–5 5–7.5 7.5–10 >10

By 2001, 575 million children (almost one-tenth the world's population) had received some two billion doses of oral polio vaccine. The World Health Organization announced that Europe was polio-free on 21 June 2002, in the Copenhagen Glyptotek.

In 2002, an outbreak of polio occurred in India. The number of planned polio vaccination campaigns had recently been reduced, and populations in northern India, particularly from the Islamic background, engaged in mass resistance to immunization. At this time, the Indian state of Uttar Pradesh accounted for nearly two thirds of total worldwide cases reported. (See the 2002 global polio incidence map.) However, by 2004, India had adopted strategies to increase ownership of polio vaccinations in marginalized populations, and the immunity gap in vulnerable groups rapidly closed.

In August 2003, rumors spread in some states in Nigeria, especially Kano, that the vaccine caused sterility in girls. This resulted in the suspension of immunization efforts in the state, causing a dramatic rise in polio rates in the already endemic country. On 30 June 2004, the WHO announced that after a 10-month ban on polio vaccinations, Kano had pledged to restart the campaign in early July. During the ban the virus spread across Nigeria and into 12 neighboring countries that had previously been polio-free. By 2006, this ban would be blamed for 1,500 children being paralyzed, and had cost $450 million for emergency activities. In addition to the rumors of sterility and the ban by Nigeria's Kano state, civil war and internal strife in Sudan and Côte d'Ivoire have complicated WHO's polio eradication goal. In 2004, 63% of all the polio cases in the world occurred in Nigeria (792 out of 1,265 total).

Countries with polio cases in 2005 Polio was endemic Polio had re-established transmission Cases were importation-related All cases were due to circulating vaccine-derived virus

In May 2004, the first case of the polio outbreak in Sudan was detected. The reemergence of polio led to stepped up vaccination campaigns. In the region of Darfur, 78,654 children were immunized and 20,432 more in southern Sudan (Yirol and Chelkou).

In 2005, there were 1,979 cases of wild poliovirus (excluding vaccine-derived poliovirus). Most cases were located in two areas: the Indian subcontinent and Nigeria. Eradication efforts in the Indian sub-continent met with a large measure of success. Using the Pulse Polio campaign to increase polio immunization rates, India recorded just 66 cases in 2005, down from 135 cases reported in 2004, 225 in 2003, and 1,600 in 2002.

Yemen, Indonesia, and Sudan, countries that had been declared polio-free since before 2000, each reported hundreds of cases—probably imported from Nigeria. On 5 May 2005, news reports broke that a new case of polio was diagnosed in Java, Indonesia, and the virus strain was suspected to be the same as the one that has caused outbreaks in Nigeria. New public fears over vaccine safety, which were unfounded, impeded vaccination efforts in Indonesia. In summer 2005, the WHO, UNICEF and the Indonesian government made new efforts to lay the fears to rest, recruiting celebrities and religious leaders in a publicity campaign to promote vaccination.

In the United States on 29 September 2005, the Minnesota Department of Health identified the first occurrence of vaccine-derived poliovirus (VDPV) transmission in the United States since OPV was discontinued in 2000. The poliovirus type 1 infection occurred in an unvaccinated, immunocompromised infant girl aged seven months (the index patient) in an Amish community whose members predominantly were not vaccinated for polio.

=== 2006–2010 ===
In 2006, only four countries in the world (Nigeria, India, Pakistan, and Afghanistan) were reported to have endemic polio. Cases in other countries are attributed to importation. A total of 1,997 cases worldwide were reported in 2006; of these the majority (1,869 cases) occurred in countries with endemic polio. Nigeria accounted for the majority of cases (1,122 cases) but India reported more than ten times more cases in 2006 than in 2005 (676 cases, or 30% of worldwide cases). Pakistan and Afghanistan reported 40 and 31 cases respectively in 2006. Polio re-surfaced in Bangladesh after nearly six years of absence with 18 new cases reported. "Our country is not safe, as neighbours India and Pakistan are not polio free", declared Health Minister ASM Matiur Rahman. (See: Map of reported polio cases in 2006)

In 2007, there were 1,315 cases of poliomyelitis reported worldwide. Over 60% of cases (874) occurred in India. In Nigeria, the number of polio cases fell dramatically, from 1,122 cases reported in 2006 to 285 cases in 2007. Officials credit the drop in new infections to improved political control in the southern states and resumed immunisation in the north, where Muslim clerics led a boycott of vaccination in late 2003. Local governments and clerics allowed vaccinations to resume on the condition that the vaccines be manufactured in Indonesia, a majority Muslim country, and not in the United States. Turai Yar'Adua, wife of recently elected Nigerian president Umaru Yar'Adua, made the eradication of polio one of her priorities. Attending the launch of immunization campaigns in Birnin Kebbi in July 2007, Turai Yar'Adua urged parents to vaccinate their children and stressed the safety of oral polio vaccine.

In July 2007, a student traveling from Pakistan imported the first polio case to Australia in over 20 years. Other countries with significant numbers of wild polio virus cases include the Democratic Republic of the Congo, which reported 41 cases, Chad with 22 cases, and Niger and Myanmar, each of which reported 11 cases.

In 2008, 18 countries reported cases and the total number of cases was 1,651. Of these, 1,505 occurred in the four endemic countries and 146 elsewhere. The largest numbers were in Nigeria (798 cases) and India (559 cases): these two countries combined had 82.2 percent of all cases. Outside endemic countries, Chad reported the greatest number (37 cases).

In 2009, a total of 1,604 cases were reported across 23 countries. Four endemic countries accounted for 1,256 of these, with the remaining 348 in 19 sub-Saharan countries with imported cases or re-established transmission. Once again, the largest numbers were in India (741) and Nigeria (388). All other countries had less than one hundred cases: Pakistan had 89 cases, Afghanistan 38, Chad 64, Sudan 45, Guinea 42, Angola 29, Côte d'Ivoire 26, Benin 20, Kenya 19, Burkina Faso 15, Niger 15, the Central African Republic 14, Mauritania 13, and Liberia and Sierra Leone both had 11. The following countries had single-digit numbers of cases: Uganda with 8 cases, Togo 6, Cameroon 3, the Democratic Republic of the Congo 3, Burundi 2, and Mali 2.

According to figures updated in April 2012, the WHO reported that there were 1,352 cases of wild polio across 20 countries in 2010. Reported cases of polio were down 95% in Nigeria (to a historic low of 21 cases) and 94% in India (to a historic low of 42 cases) compared to the previous year, with little change in Afghanistan (from 38 to 25 cases) and an increase in cases in Pakistan (from 89 to 144 cases). An acute outbreak in Tajikistan gave rise to 460 cases (34% of the global total), and was associated with a further 18 cases across Central Asia (Kazakhstan and Turkmenistan) and the Russian Federation, with the most recent case from this region being reported from Russia 25 September. These were the first cases in the WHO European region since 2002. The Republic of the Congo (Brazzaville) saw an outbreak with 441 cases (30% of the global total). At least 179 deaths were associated with this outbreak, which is believed to have been an importation from the ongoing type 1 outbreak in Angola (33 cases in 2010) and the Democratic Republic of the Congo (100 cases).

=== 2011–2015 ===
Countries with polio cases in 2011

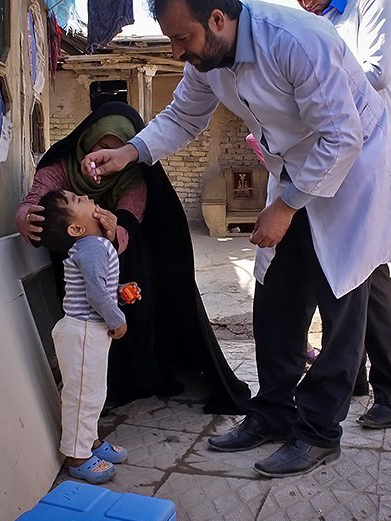
Polio vaccination in Tehran.

In 2011, 650 WPV cases were reported across sixteen countries: the four endemic countries—Pakistan, Afghanistan, Nigeria, and India—as well as twelve others. Polio transmission recurred in Angola, Chad and the Democratic Republic of the Congo. Kenya reported its first case since 2009, while China reported 21 cases, mostly among the Uyghurs of Hotan prefecture, Xinjiang, the first non-imported cases since 1994.

The total number of wild-virus cases reported in 2012 was 223, lower than any previous year. These were limited to five countries—Nigeria, Pakistan, Afghanistan, Chad, and Niger—of which all except Nigeria had fewer cases than in 2011. Several additional countries, Chad, the Democratic Republic of the Congo, Somalia, and Yemen, saw outbreaks of circulating vaccine-derived polio. The last reported type 3 case of polio worldwide had its onset 11 November 2012 in Nigeria; the last wild case outside Nigeria was in April 2012 in Pakistan, and its absence from sewage monitoring in Pakistan suggests that active transmission of this strain has ceased there. A total of 416 wild-virus cases were reported in 2013, almost double the previous year. Of these, cases in endemic countries dropped from 197 to 160, while those in non-endemic countries jumped from 5 to 256. This was due to outbreaks in Central Africa (focused in Cameroon), the Horn of Africa, and the Middle East (focused in Syria).

In April 2013, a case of wild polio in Mogadishu was reported, the first in Somalia since 2007. By October, over 170 cases had been reported in the country, with more cases in neighboring Kenya and the Somali Region of Ethiopia.

Routine sewage monitoring in 2012 had detected a WPV1 strain of Pakistani origin in Cairo, sparking a major vaccination push there. The strain spread to Israel, where there was widespread environmental detection, but like Egypt, no paralysis cases. It had more severe consequences when it spread to neighboring Syria, with the total number of cases eventually reaching 35, the first outbreak there since 1999.

In April 2013, the WHO announced a new $5.5 billion, 6-year cooperative plan (called the 2013–18 Polio Eradication and Endgame Strategic Plan) to eradicate polio from its last reservoirs. The plan called for mass immunization campaigns in the three remaining endemic countries, and also dictated a switch to inactivated virus injections, to avoid the risk of the vaccine-derived outbreaks that occasionally occur from use of the live-virus oral vaccine.

In 2014, there were 359 reported cases of wild poliomyelitis, spread over twelve countries. Pakistan had the most with 306, an increase from 93 in 2013, which was blamed on Al Qaeda and Taliban militants preventing aid workers from vaccinating children in rural regions of the country. On 27 March 2014, the WHO announced the eradication of poliomyelitis in the South-East Asia Region, in which the WHO includes eleven countries: Bangladesh, Bhutan, North Korea, India, Indonesia, Maldives, Myanmar, Nepal, Sri Lanka, Thailand, and Timor-Leste. With the addition of this region, the proportion of world population living in polio-free regions reached 80%. The last case of wild polio in the South-East Asia Region was reported in India on 13 January 2011.

Countries with polio cases in 2015

During 2015, 74 cases of wild poliomyelitis were reported worldwide, 54 in Pakistan and 20 in Afghanistan. There were 32 circulating vaccine-derived poliovirus (cVDPV) cases in 2015.

On 25 September 2015, the WHO declared that Nigeria was no longer considered endemic for wild polio virus, with no reported case of wild polio virus having been reported since 24 July 2014. A WPV1 strain not seen in five years resurfaced in Nigeria the following year.

The WPV2 virus was declared eradicated in September 2015 as it had not been detected in circulation since 1999, and WPV3 was declared eradicated in October 2019, having last been detected in 2012. However, both types persist as circulating vaccine-derived strains, the product of years of evolution of the attenuated "live" virus (which makes up the oral vaccine) as it transmits from the vaccinated to the unvaccinated and circulates in an under-immunized community.

=== 2016–2020 ===
Reported polio cases in 2016
Country	Wild cases	Circulating vaccine- derived cases	Transmission status	Type(s)
Pakistan	20	1	endemic	WPV1 cVDPV2
Afghanistan	13	0	endemic	WPV1
Nigeria	4	1	endemic	WPV1 cVDPV2
Laos	0	3	cVDPV only	cVDPV1
Total	37	5		

Because cVDPV2 strains continued to arise from trivalent oral vaccine that included attenuated PV2, during 2016 this vaccine was replaced with a bivalent version lacking WPV2 as well as trivalent injected inactivated vaccine that cannot lead to cVDPV cases. This was expected to prevent new strains of cVDPV2 from arising and allow eventual cessation of WPV2 vaccination. The resulting global use of the injectable vaccine caused shortages, and led the WHO in April 2017 to recommend general use of the fIPV vaccination protocol, involving subcutaneous injection of a lower dose than used in the standard intramuscular delivery.

In 2016 there were 37 reported WPV1 cases, half as many as in 2015, with the majority of the cases in Pakistan and Afghanistan. A small number of additional cases in Nigeria, caused by WPV1, were viewed as a setback, the first being detected there in almost two years, yet the virus had been circulating undetected in regions inaccessible due to the activities of Boko Haram. There was also a cVDPV1 outbreak in Laos, while new strains of cVDPV2 arose separately in Nigeria's Borno and Sekoto states, and in the Quetta area of Pakistan, collectively causing five cases.

Reported polio cases in 2017
Country	Wild cases	Circulating vaccine- derived cases	Transmission status	Type(s)
Afghanistan	14	0	endemic	WPV1
Pakistan	8	0	endemic	WPV1
Dem. Rep. Congo	0	22	cVDPV only	cVDPV2
Syria	0	74	cVDPV only	cVDPV2
Total	22	96		

In 2017 there were 22 reported WPV1 polio cases with onset of paralysis in 2017, down from 37 in 2016. Eight of the cases were in Pakistan and 14 in Afghanistan, where genetic typing showed repeated introduction from Pakistan as well as local transmission. In Pakistan, transmission of several genetic lineages of WPV1 seen in 2015 had been interrupted by September 2017, though at least two genetic clusters remain. In spite of a significant drop in detected cases in Pakistan, there was an increase in the percentage of environmental samples that test positive for the polio virus, suggesting gaps in identification of infected individuals. In the third country where polio remained endemic, Nigeria, there were no cases, though as few as 7% of infants were fully vaccinated in some districts. An April 2017 spill at a vaccine production facility in the Netherlands only resulted in one asymptomatic WPV2 infection, despite release into the sewer system.

Laos was declared free of cVDPV1 in March 2017, but three distinct cVDPV2 outbreaks occurred in the Democratic Republic of the Congo, one of them of recent origin, the other two having circulated undetected for more than a year. Together they caused 20 cases by year's end. In Syria, a large outbreak began at Mayadin, Deir ez-Zor Governorate, a center of fighting in the Syrian Civil War, and also spreading to neighboring districts saw 74 confirmed cases from a viral strain that had circulated undetected for about two years. Circulation of multiple genetic lines of cVDPV2 was also detected in Banadir province, Somalia, but no infected individuals were identified. WHO's Strategic Advisory Group of Experts on Immunization recommended that cVDPV2 suppression be prioritized over targeting WPV1, and according to protocol OPV2 is restricted to this purpose.

Reported polio cases in 2018
Country	Wild cases	Circulating vaccine- derived cases	Transmission status	Type
Afghanistan	21	0	endemic	WPV1
Pakistan	12	0	endemic	WPV1
Nigeria	0	34	cVDPV only	cVDPV2
Papua New Guinea	0	26	cVDPV only	cVDPV1
Dem. Rep. Congo	0	20	cVDPV only	cVDPV2
Niger	0	10	cVDPV only	cVDPV2
Somalia	0	6	cVDPV only	cVDPV2 cVDPV3
Indonesia	0	1	cVDPV only	cVDPV1
Mozambique	0	1	cVDPV only	cVDPV2
Total	33	98		

There were 33 reported WPV1 paralysis cases with an onset of paralysis in 2018 – 21 in Afghanistan and 12 in Pakistan. Polio in Pakistan resurged in the latter part of the year, due in part to the rates of parental refusal for vaccination increasing, with wild poliovirus detected in 20% of the year's environmental samples. In Afghanistan different strains were largely responsible for the cases in the northeast and south of the country. In Nigeria, the third country classified as having endemic transmission, security concerns continued to limit access to some areas of the country, though migration and novel vaccination approaches would reduce the number of unreached children. The nation passed two full years without a detected wild-virus case, though elimination of WPV transmission could not be confirmed.

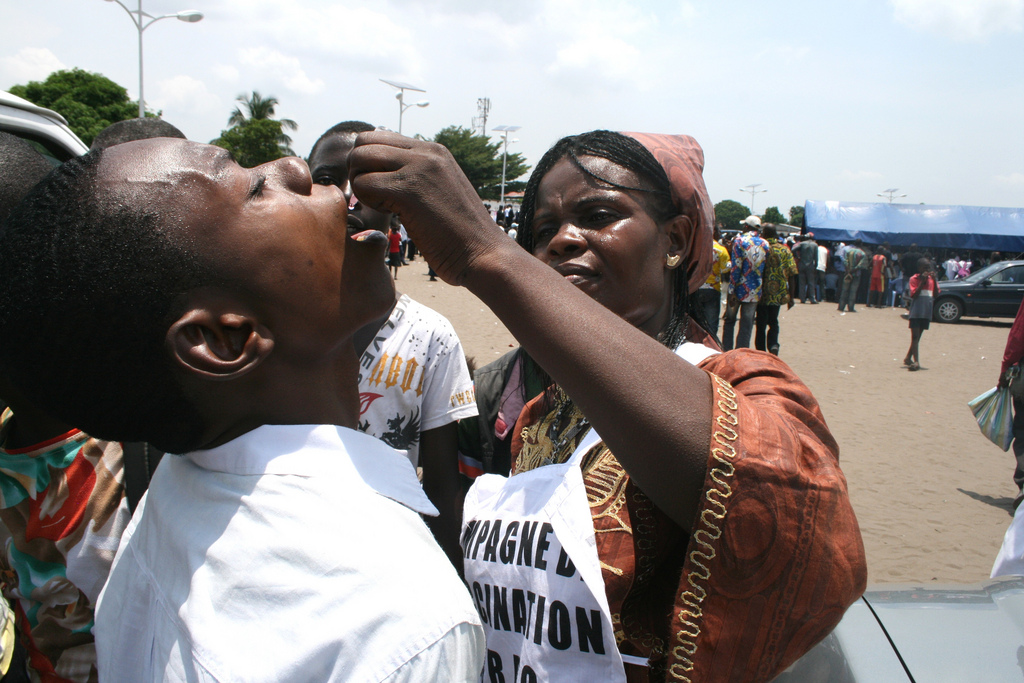
Polio vaccination in the Democratic Republic of Congo

Cases caused by vaccine-derived poliovirus were reported in seven countries in 2018, with over 100 total cases, representing nine strains of cVDPV. In the Democratic Republic of the Congo, one of the outbreaks of cVDPV2 first detected in 2017 caused no additional cases, but suppression of the other two with OPV2 proved insufficient: not only did they continue, but the vaccination efforts gave rise to a novel cVDPV2 outbreak. The country experienced a total of 20 cases in 2018. Two separate cVDPV2 outbreaks in northern Nigeria produced 34 cases, as well as giving rise to 10 cases in the neighboring Niger. In Somalia, cVDPV2 continued to circulate, causing several polio cases and detected in environmental samples from as far as Nairobi, Kenya. This virus, along with newly detected cVDPV3, caused twelve total cases in the country, including one patient infected by both strains. The large number of children residing in areas inaccessible to health workers represented a particular risk for undetected cVDPV outbreaks. A cVDPV2 outbreak in Mozambique resulted in a single case. Response to the Syrian cVDPV2 outbreak continued into 2018, and virus transmission was successfully interrupted. In Papua New Guinea, a cVDPV1 strain arose, causing twenty-six polio cases across nine provinces, while a single diagnosed cVDPV1 case in neighboring Indonesia resulted from a distinct outbreak.

Reported polio cases in 2019
Country	Wild cases	Circulating vaccine- derived cases	Transmission status	Type
Pakistan	146	22	endemic	WPV1 cVDPV2
Afghanistan	29	0	endemic	WPV1
Angola	0	138	cVDPV only	cVDPV2
Dem. Rep. Congo	0	88	cVDPV only	cVDPV2
Central African Rep.	0	21	cVDPV only	cVDPV2
Ghana	0	18	cVDPV only	cVDPV2
Nigeria	0	18	cVDPV only	cVDPV2
Ethiopia	0	14	cVDPV only	cVDPV2
Philippines	0	14	cVDPV only	cVDPV1 cVDPV2
Chad	0	11	cVDPV only	cVDPV2
Benin	0	8	cVDPV only	cVDPV2
Togo	0	8	cVDPV only	cVDPV2
Myanmar	0	6	cVDPV only	cVDPV1
Somalia	0	3	cVDPV only	cVDPV2
Malaysia	0	3	cVDPV only	cVDPV1
Zambia	0	2	cVDPV only	cVDPV2
Burkina Faso	0	1	cVDPV only	cVDPV2
China	0	1	cVDPV only	cVDPV2
Niger	0	1	cVDPV only	cVDPV2
Yemen	0	1	cVDPV only	cVDPV1
Total	176	378		

In 2019 there were 176 WPV1 paralysis cases detected: 29 in Afghanistan and 147 in Pakistan. In particular, in Pakistan the number of cases was surging and cross-border migration played a role in polio transmission between the two countries. While itself problematic, this also fostered a dangerous false narrative in both nations, blaming the other for the presence and spread of polio in their own country. Environmental sampling in Pakistan showed the virus' presence in eight urban areas, a setback officials attributed primarily to vaccine refusal. Opponents to vaccination in Pakistan launched a series of attacks in April that left one vaccinator and two security men dead, while false rumors and hoax videos reporting vaccine toxicity also disrupted vaccination efforts there. Wild poliovirus of Pakistani origin also spread to Iran where it was detected in several environmental samples. Overall, the eradication efforts in Pakistan and Afghanistan were characterized as having become a "horror show", undermined by "public suspicion, political infighting, mismanagement and security problems".

In the third remaining country in which polio was classified as endemic, Nigeria, wild poliovirus had not been detected since October 2016, and levels of AFP surveillance were sufficient, even in security-compromised regions, to suggest transmission of WPV might have been interrupted. Global WPV3 eradication was certified in October 2019, the virus not having been seen since 2012.

In addition to the WPV resurgence in Pakistan and Afghanistan, 2019 saw a resurgence of cVDPV, with 378 cases. The majority of cases were caused by cVDPV2 strains that were able to arise or spread as a consequence of the withdrawal of the PV2 strain from the standard vaccination regimen. Previous cVDPV2 outbreaks in Nigeria, the Democratic Republic of Congo, and Somalia continued into 2019 and spread to neighboring countries, while several countries experienced new outbreaks. In addition to eighteen reported paralysis cases in Nigeria, the cVDPV2 outbreaks there spread to Benin, Burkina Faso, Chad, Ghana, Niger, and Togo, while the virus was also detected in environmental samples from Cameroon and Ivory Coast. Somalia's continuing outbreaks caused a half-dozen cases there and in neighboring Ethiopia, with a separate Ethiopia outbreak adding one case. The Democratic Republic of the Congo had numerous new and continuing outbreaks, producing more than 80 cases, while multiple new cVDPV2 outbreaks in Angola and the Central African Republic resulted in more than a hundred cases. Individual new outbreaks of cVDPV2 also caused more than a dozen paralysis cases each in Pakistan and the Philippines, while smaller outbreaks struck Chad, China, and Zambia. A separate cVDPV1 outbreak in the Philippines also caused cases in Malaysia, where cVDPV2 of Filipino origin was also detected in environmental samples, while additional cVDPV1 outbreaks caused six cases in Myanmar and one case in Yemen.

Reported polio cases in 2020
Country	Wild cases	Circulating vaccine- derived cases	Transmission status	Type
Pakistan	84	135	endemic	WPV1 cVDPV2
Afghanistan	56	308	endemic	WPV1 cVDPV2
Chad	0	99	cVDPV only	cVDPV2
Dem. Rep. Congo	0	81	cVDPV only	cVDPV2
Burkina Faso	0	65	cVDPV only	cVDPV2
Ivory Coast	0	61	cVDPV only	cVDPV2
Sudan	0	58	cVDPV only	cVDPV2
Mali	0	52	cVDPV only	cVDPV2
South Sudan	0	50	cVDPV only	cVDPV2
Guinea	0	44	cVDPV only	cVDPV2
Ethiopia	0	36	cVDPV only	cVDPV2
Yemen	0	31	cVDPV only	cVDPV1
Somalia	0	14	cVDPV only	cVDPV2
Ghana	0	12	cVDPV only	cVDPV2
Niger	0	10	cVDPV only	cVDPV2
Sierra Leone	0	10	cVDPV only	cVDPV2
Togo	0	9	cVDPV only	cVDPV2
Nigeria	0	8	cVDPV only	cVDPV2
Cameroon	0	7	cVDPV only	cVDPV2
Central African Rep.	0	4	cVDPV only	cVDPV2
Angola	0	3	cVDPV only	cVDPV2
Benin	0	3	cVDPV only	cVDPV2
Rep. Congo	0	2	cVDPV only	cVDPV2
Madagascar	0	2	cVDPV only	cVDPV1
Malaysia	0	1	cVDPV only	cVDPV1
Philippines	0	1	cVDPV only	cVDPV2
Tajikistan	0	1	cVDPV only	cVDPV2
Total	140	1107		

In March 2020, the GPEI announced polio eradication resources were being redeployed against the COVID-19 pandemic, recognizing that this would adversely affect its efforts at eradicating polio. All vaccination efforts, both routine and targeted, were postponed for several months, with staff reassigned to COVID-19 control. Subsequent statistical analysis indicated that the COVID pandemic resulted in decreases of more than 30% globally in both AFP and environmental surveillance, with only 23 of 43 priority countries meeting their surveillance targets for 2020. Additional challenges were a conspiracy theory circulating on social media claiming that the polio vaccine contained coronavirus, and moves by President Donald Trump of the United States to cut funding for the World Health Organization.

Nigeria was removed from the list of countries with endemic wild poliovirus in June 2020, four years after the last recorded case in the Northern State of Borno in 2016. Two months later, the World Health Organization declared the African continent free of wild poliovirus. This certification came after extensive assessments of the certifications of National Polio Certification Commissions (NCCs) and confirmation that at least 95% of Africa's population had been immunised. WHO Director-General Tedros Adhanom called it a "great day... but not the end of polio", as there remain major continuing outbreaks of vaccine-derived poliovirus in West Africa and Ethiopia in addition to wild cases in Afghanistan and Pakistan.

Over 1,000 cases of cVDPV2 were reported in 2020 across twenty-four countries, caused by both continuing and novel outbreaks, with 31 additional cases of cVDPV1 and environmental detection in several additional countries with no diagnosed polio cases. While in the past cVDPV outbreaks tended to be localized, significant international spread was observed of these strains.

=== 2021 ===
Confirmed polio cases in 2021
Country	Wild cases	Circulating vaccine- derived cases	Transmission status	Type
Afghanistan	4	43	endemic	WPV1 cVDPV2
Malawi	1	0	reintroduced	WPV1
Pakistan	1	8	endemic	WPV1 cVDPV2
Nigeria	0	418	cVDPV only	cVDPV2
Yemen	0	69	cVDPV only	cVDPV1 cVDPV2
Tajikistan	0	35	cVDPV only	cVDPV2
Dem. Rep. Congo	0	28	cVDPV only	cVDPV2
Niger	0	18	cVDPV only	cVDPV2
Senegal	0	17	cVDPV only	cVDPV2
Madagascar	0	14	cVDPV only	cVDPV1
Ethiopia	0	10	cVDPV only	cVDPV2
South Sudan	0	9	cVDPV only	cVDPV2
Guinea	0	6	cVDPV only	cVDPV2
Sierra Leone	0	5	cVDPV only	cVDPV2
Benin	0	3	cVDPV only	cVDPV2
Cameroon	0	3	cVDPV only	cVDPV2
Guinea-Bissau	0	3	cVDPV only	cVDPV2
Liberia	0	3	cVDPV only	cVDPV2
Burkina Faso	0	2	cVDPV only	cVDPV2
Mozambique	0	2	cVDPV only	cVDPV2
Rep. Congo	0	2	cVDPV only	cVDPV2
Ukraine	0	2	cVDPV only	cVDPV2
Eritrea	0	1	cVDPV only	cVDPV2
Somalia	0	1	cVDPV only	cVDPV2
Total	6	688		

In 2021, there were just six confirmed cases of wild poliovirus – one in Pakistan, four in Afghanistan, and one in Malawi.

2021 saw a partial recovery from the challenges to monitoring brought on by the COVID pandemic, with 74% of high-priority countries meeting surveillance targets, an improvement of over 20% from the previous year. March 2021 also saw the first use of the modified nOPV2 vaccine in selected countries, engineered to allow vaccination against strain 2 poliovirus without the frequent spawning of cVDPV2 seen with the original OPV2. Full rollout was not expected until 2023.

Despite previous resistance to eradication efforts, after their takeover of Afghanistan in 2021 the Taliban agreed to allow United Nations healthcare workers to carry out door-to-door vaccination nationwide for the first time in three years, including a commitment to allowing women to participate in the effort, and to provide safety guarantees to eradication staff. Pakistan's lone case dated from January, but the virus continued to be detected in environmental samples through December, and was present in most provinces of the country during the year. The reemergence of wild poliovirus in Malawi, the country's first case in almost three decades and the first in Africa in five years, was seen as a significant setback to the eradication effort. Based on similarity to a strain last detected in Pakistan in 2019, it was thought that WPV1 had been circulating undetected in the country for some time.

In 2021, reported cVDPV2 cases declined to 685 across 22 countries, over half occurring in Nigeria. The virus was also found in environmental samples or in those from symptom-free people in several additional African and Asian nations without reported cases. An analysis of cVDPV2 strains from 2020 and the first half of 2021 attributed them to 38 distinct emergences, representing a mix of novel strains and previously detected strains that continued to circulate, while several previously circulating strains were no longer found. 14 cases of cVDPV1 were identified in Madagascar and 3 in Yemen. No cases of cVDPV3 were observed, though it was detected in environmental samples from China and from Israel and its occupied territories.

=== 2022 ===
Confirmed polio cases in 2022
Country	Wild cases	Circulating vaccine- derived cases	Transmission status	Type
Pakistan	20	0	endemic	WPV1
Mozambique	8	22; 4	imported	WPV1 cVDPV1 cVDPV2
Afghanistan	2	0	endemic	WPV1
Dem. Rep. Congo	0	149; 372	cVDPV only	cVDPV1 cVDPV2
Yemen	0	162	cVDPV only	cVDPV2
Nigeria	0	48	cVDPV only	cVDPV2
Chad	0	44	cVDPV only	cVDPV2
Madagascar	0	16	cVDPV only	cVDPV1
Niger	0	16	cVDPV only	cVDPV2
Benin	0	13	cVDPV only	cVDPV2
Central African Republic	0	6	cVDPV only	cVDPV2
Somalia	0	5	cVDPV only	cVDPV2
Malawi	0	4	cVDPV only	cVDPV1
Algeria	0	3	cVDPV only	cVDPV2
Cameroon	0	3	cVDPV only	cVDPV2
Ghana	0	3	cVDPV only	cVDPV2
Mali	0	2	cVDPV only	cVDPV2
Togo	0	2	cVDPV only	cVDPV2
Burundi	0	1	cVDPV only	cVDPV2
Eritrea	0	1	cVDPV only	cVDPV2
Ethiopia	0	1	cVDPV only	cVDPV2
Indonesia	0	1	cVDPV only	cVDPV2
Israel	0	1	cVDPV only	cVDPV3
Rep. Congo	0	1	cVDPV only	cVDPV1
Sudan	0	1	cVDPV only	cVDPV2
United States	0	1	cVDPV only	cVDPV2
Total	30	880		

In 2022, there were 30 confirmed cases of WPV1 reported to WHO, with 2 and 20 cases in Pakistan and Afghanistan respectively, while eight non-endemic cases were recorded in Mozambique, the first cases in the country since 1992. The Mozambique cases derived from the strain of Pakistani origin that caused two confirmed cases in Malawi in 2021. The cases in Pakistan were the first seen in the country in 15 months, though the virus had been detected in environmental samples during the intervening period.

The residual effects of the COVID-19 pandemic continued to be a cause for concern, due to an increased risk of undetected outbreaks due to COVID's interference with routine health care, disease detection, and childhood vaccinations, as well as a concern that an increased fear of vaccines, caused at least in part by politicization of vaccination and bad governance during the pandemic, might result in a general pattern of undervaccination, including for polio. In Pakistan, a contributing factor to the resurgence of wild virus cases in the country was threats of violence both from those with anti-vaccine sentiment and from religious extremists. A vaccination worker was assassinated in March 2022, and a vaccinator and two accompanying police officers providing security for a door-to-door vaccination campaign were murdered in June. However, the situation had improved compared to previous years as the government and law enforcement increased their focus. By October 2022, endemic transmission was restricted to seven districts in southern Khyber Pakhtunkhwa, and the number of circulating genetic clusters was down to one, from eleven in 2020.

The situation improved in Afghanistan as well, as between 2021 and 2022 the country became significantly more peaceful as the government consolidated their control, though with remaining pockets of violence.

Vaccine-derived cases continue to circulate, particularly in the African and Eastern Mediterranean WHO regions. Concern was focused on Ukraine, where cVDPV had been detected in fall 2021 but vaccination efforts had been halted due to the Russian invasion, and on poor quality surveillance extant in Southeast Africa 684 confirmed cases of cVDPV2 were seen across twenty countries during 2022, in addition to 189 cases of cVDPV1 and one case of cVDPV3 in Israel. The first case was reported in the United States since 2013, tied to cVDPV2 strains found in Israel and the United Kingdom. In Burundi and the Democratic Republic of the Congo, two outbreaks of cVDPV2 that caused a combined seven cases were identified as having a link to the nOPV2 vaccine, the first outbreaks with ties to nOPV2 after its initial deployment in 2021; according to an assessment reported by the GPEI, an estimated 30–40 additional outbreaks of cVDPV2 would have occurred from March 2021 to March 2023 without the nOPV2 rollout. Vaccine-derived viral strains were also detected in environmental samples from a number of additional countries without diagnosed cases. From February to May, traces of cVDPV2 were discovered in sewage in London, United Kingdom. This led the United Kingdom to declare a "national incident". However, authorities have said that the risk to the general public is "extremely low", and no cases were reported.

=== 2023 ===
Confirmed polio cases in 2023
Country	Wild cases	Circulating vaccine- derived cases	Transmission status	Type
Afghanistan	6	0	endemic	WPV1
Pakistan	6	0	endemic	WPV1
DRC	0	106; 121	cVDPV only	cVDPV1 cVDPV2
Nigeria	0	87	cVDPV only	cVDPV2
Chad	0	55	cVDPV only	cVDPV2
Guinea	0	47	cVDPV only	cVDPV2
Madagascar	0	24	cVDPV only	cVDPV1
Mali	0	16	cVDPV only	cVDPV2
CAR	0	14	cVDPV only	cVDPV2
Kenya	0	8	cVDPV only	cVDPV2
Yemen	0	8	cVDPV only	cVDPV2
Ivory Coast	0	6	cVDPV only	cVDPV2
Indonesia	0	6	cVDPV only	cVDPV2
Somalia	0	5	cVDPV only	cVDPV2
Mozambique	0	4; 1	cVDPV only	cVDPV1 cVDPV2
Benin	0	3	cVDPV only	cVDPV2
Tanzania	0	3	cVDPV only	cVDPV2
Burkina Faso	0	3	cVDPV only	cVDPV2
South Sudan	0	3	cVDPV only	cVDPV2
Niger	0	2	cVDPV only	cVDPV2
Israel	0	1	cVDPV only	cVDPV2
Mauritania	0	1	cVDPV only	cVDPV2
Burundi	0	1	cVDPV only	cVDPV2
Zambia	0	1	cVDPV only	cVDPV2
Zimbabwe	0	1	cVDPV only	cVDPV2
Total	12	530		

Twelve cases of WPV1 were reported in 2023, six in Afghanistan and Pakistan each. Additionally, 187 positive environmental samples were reported in those countries. There were 391 confirmed cases of cVDPV2 reported to the WHO in 2023, across 22 countries, nineteen of which lie in Sub-Saharan Africa, with only a handful of cases in Indonesia, Yemen, and Israel being the exception. cVDPV1 was now concentrated in three countries, with 105 cases in the Democratic Republic of the Congo, 24 in Madagascar and four in Mozambique. No cVDPV3 virus had been detected for two years.

The Independent Monitoring Board of the GPEI in its September 2023 Report mentioned a continued, geographically restricted, endemic transmission in the east of Afghanistan and in the southern districts of Pakistan's Khyber Pakhtunkhwa province. Only one wild polio genetic cluster remained in Afghanistan, with a much improved immunity rate (>90%) in the population. Levels of access in the country were the best they had been since 2018. However, a large pool of unvaccinated children remained in the Kandahar province, potentially leading to a large outbreak if the virus were to reappear there. In Pakistan, estimates were that the long-standing and intractable poliovirus circulation in most of the traditional endemic reservoirs had been eliminated. However, a positive environmental probe in Karachi, after no cases for over a year, raised concerns about the quality of the vaccination campaign in Pakistan.

=== 2024 ===
Confirmed polio cases in 2024
Country	Wild cases	Circulating vaccine- derived cases	Transmission status	Type
Pakistan	74	0	endemic	WPV1
Afghanistan	25	0	endemic	WPV1
Yemen	0	187	cVDPV only	cVDPV2
Nigeria	0	98	cVDPV only	cVDPV2
Ethiopia	0	44	cVDPV only	cVDPV2
Chad	0	39	cVDPV only	cVDPV2
DRC	0	10; 15	cVDPV only	cVDPV1 cVDPV2
Niger	0	16	cVDPV only	cVDPV2
South Sudan	0	10	cVDPV only	cVDPV2
Angola	0	9	cVDPV only	cVDPV2
Guinea	0	5; 4	cVDPV only	cVDPV2 cVDPV3
Indonesia	0	7	cVDPV only	cVDPV2
Somalia	0	7	cVDPV only	cVDPV2
Cameroon	0	3	cVDPV only	cVDPV2
Algeria	0	1	cVDPV only	cVDPV2
Benin	0	1	cVDPV only	cVDPV2
Ivory Coast	0	1	cVDPV only	cVDPV2
Liberia	0	1	cVDPV only	cVDPV2
Mali	0	1	cVDPV only	cVDPV2
Mozambique	0	1	cVDPV only	cVDPV1
Gaza	0	1	cVDPV only	cVDPV2
Senegal	0	1	cVDPV only	cVDPV2
Sudan	0	1	cVDPV only	cVDPV2
Total	99	463		

During 2024 there were 99 reported cases of WPV1 with 74 from Pakistan and 25 from Afghanistan. Additionally, 649 positive environmental samples were collected in Pakistan and 124 in Afghanistan.

425 cases of cVDPV2 cases were found across twenty countries, all of which were in Sub-Saharan Africa except for Algeria in Northern Africa, Indonesia in Southeast Asia, and Yemen and Gaza in West Asia. In addition, seventeen countries had positive environmental samples of cVDPV2 but no confirmed cases: Bahrain, Djibouti, Egypt, Equatorial Guinea, Finland, Gambia, Germany, Ghana, Kenya, Mozambique, Poland, Senegal, Sierra Leone, Spain, Uganda, United Kingdom and Zimbabwe. France had one positive environmental sample of cVDPV3.

Ten cVDPV1 cases were detected in the Democratic Republic of the Congo and one in Mozambique.

After one and a half years without any cases, cVDPV3 reappeared with four new cases in Guinea between September and November.

=== 2025 ===
Confirmed polio cases in 2025
Country	Wild cases	Circulating vaccine- derived cases	Transmission status	Type
Pakistan	31	0	endemic	WPV1
Afghanistan	21	0	endemic	WPV1
Nigeria	0	66; 6	cVDPV only	cVDPV2 cVDPV3
Ethiopia	0	40	cVDPV only	cVDPV2
Chad	0	31; 4	cVDPV only	cVDPV2 cVDPV3
Yemen	0	30	cVDPV only	cVDPV2
Angola	0	19	cVDPV only	cVDPV2
Democratic Republic of the Congo	0	6; 5	cVDPV only	cVDPV2 cVDPV1
Sudan	0	7	cVDPV only	cVDPV2
Papua New Guinea	0	5	cVDPV only	cVDPV2
Benin	0	3	cVDPV only	cVDPV2
Niger	0	3	cVDPV only	cVDPV2
Guinea	0	2	cVDPV only	cVDPV3
Somalia	0	2	cVDPV only	cVDPV2
Central African Republic	0	2	cVDPV only	cVDPV2
Burkina Faso	0	1	cVDPV only	cVDPV2
Djibouti	0	1	cVDPV only	cVDPV2
Cameroon	0	1	cVDPV only	cVDPV3
Algeria	0	1	cVDPV only	cVDPV1
Laos	0	1	cVDPV only	cVDPV1
Mali	0	1	cVDPV only	cVDPV1
Total	52	233		

During 2025, there were 51 reported cases of WPV1 with 31 from Pakistan and 21 from Afghanistan. Additionally, 661 positive environmental samples were collected in Pakistan and 90 in Afghanistan, and, after 30 years of absence, three positive samples in Germany.

217 cases of cVDPV2 were found across fourteen countries, all of which were in Sub-Saharan Africa with the exception of Yemen in West Asia and Papua New Guinea in Oceania. In addition, seven countries from Africa, three from Europe and two from West Asia had positive environmental samples of cVDPV2 but no confirmed cases: Algeria, Cameroon, Ivory Coast, Germany, Israel, Malawi, Namibia, Israel, Poland, Senegal, the United Kingdom, and Tanzania.

There has been one case each of cVDPV1 in the Democratic Republic of the Congo, Algeria, and Laos. Some environmental samples were detected this year in Djibouti and Israel with 10 cases each. Last virus was seen in July.

cVDPV3 continued in Nigeria (6), Chad (4), two in Guinea, and with one case in Cameroon.

=== 2026 ===
Confirmed polio cases in 2026
Country	Wild cases	Circulating vaccine- derived cases	Transmission status	Type
Afghanistan	50	0	endemic	WPV1
Pakistan	9	0	endemic	WPV1
Democratic Republic of Congo	0	102	cVDPV only	cVDPV2
Nigeria	0	37; 19	cVDPV only	cVDPV2 cVDPV3
South Sudan	0	19; 4	cVDPV only	cVDPV1 cVDPV2
Chad	0	13; 1	cVDPV only	cVDPV2 cVDPV3
Ethiopia	0	9	cVDPV only	cVDPV1
Somalia	0	6	cVDPV only	cVDPV2
Mali	0	5	cVDPV only	cVDPV2
Sudan	0	4	cVDPV only	cVDPV2
Central African Republic	0	4	cVDPV only	cVDPV2
Laos	0	3	cVDPV only	cVDPV1
Syrian Arab Republic	0	3	cVDPV only	cVDPV1
Togo	0	2	cVDPV only	cVDPV2
Niger	0	2	cVDPV only	cVDPV3
Madagascar	0	2	cVDPV only	cVDPV1
Angola	0	1	cVDPV only	cVDPV2
Total	59	243		

As of 16 November 2026, year-to-date, there have been 59 cases of WPV1 across Afghanistan (50) and Pakistan (9). Positive environmental samples have also been collected in Pakistan (156) and Afghanistan (110).

180 cases of cVDPV2 have been found across Nigeria, the Democratic Republic of Congo, Chad, Somalia, Central African Republic, Togo, Angola, Mali, and Sudan. Positive environmental samples have also been reported in Algeria, Australia, Kenya, Libya, Namibia, Malawi, South Sudan, Uganda, and the United Kingdom.

40 cases of cVDPV1 have been found across South Sudan (19), Ethiopia (11), Madagascar (4), Syrian Arab Republic(3), and Laos (3).

23 cases of cVDPV3 have been found across Nigeria (19), Niger (3), and Chad (1).

== See also ==
- Global Polio Eradication Initiative
- The Final Inch, a 2009 documentary film about the eradication effort
- List of diseases eliminated from the United States
- Mathematical modelling of infectious disease
- Polio in Pakistan
- Population health
- 2024 Gaza Strip polio outbreak
