= Gazipur Cantonment College =

- গাজীপুর ক্যান্টনমেন্ট কলেজ

Location
- BOF, Gazipur Cantonment; 1703; Bangladesh
- Coordinates: 24.0408°N 90.4142°E

Information
- Established: 1992
- School board: Dhaka Education Board
- School code: 109033
- Principal: Lt Col Md Mohibul Akbar Mazumdar, PSC, AEC
- Staff: 22
- Teaching staff: 40
- Grades: 11–12, BBA (accounting) & BSS (social work)
- Gender: Co-educational
- Age range: 17 to 19+
- Enrollment: 1,750
- Language: Bengali
- Campus size: 5 acres (2.0 ha)
- Campus type: Urban
- Website: gccbof.edu.bd

Gazipur Cantonment College (also referred to as GCC) (Bengali: গাজীপুর ক্যান্টনমেন্ট কলেজ), is a college B. O. F, Gazipur Cantonment, Gazipur, Bangladesh. The college offers education for students ranging from Eleventh grade to Graduation (approximately ages 16 to 19) both male and female.

== Teachers forum ==
Gazipur Cantonment College is controlled by the Bangladesh Ordnance Factories. All the teachers are appointed by the committee of the college.
