= Gloucester County Christian School =

Christian school in Gloucester County, New Jersey, United States

Location
- 151 Golf Club Road; Sewell, Gloucester County, New Jersey 08080
- 39.73689°N 75.16002°W

Information
- Type: Private school
- Motto: Assist Christian Parents in the Education of their Children.
- Religious affiliation: Christian
- Established: 1964
- School board: Hardingville Bible church
- NCES School ID: A1502344
- Principal: Mary Davis (elementary school); Adam Capel (secondary school)
- Faculty: 20.3 FTEs
- Grades: PreK-12
- Enrollment: 348 (plus 26 in PreK, as of 2023–24)
- Student to teacher ratio: 17.1:1
- Schedule type: Block schedule
- Color: white/navy blue
- Song: To God be the Glory
- Sports: Soccer, basketball, men's baseball, women's softball
- Mascot: The Conqueror, a knight in full armor
- Nickname: GCCS
- Teams: The Conquerors (soccer, basketball, men's baseball, women's softball)
- Rival: The Pilgrim Academy
- Website: www.gccs.co

Gloucester County Christian School (GCCS) is a private Christian school located in the Sewell section of Mantua Township, New Jersey, United States. Gloucester County Christian School was founded in 1964 and organized by a group of parents. GCCS is owned and operated by Hardingville Bible Church. The school is a member of the American Association of Christian Schools and the Garden State Association of Christian Schools.

As of the 2023–24 school year, the school had an enrollment of 348 students (plus 26 in PreK) and 20.3 classroom teachers (on an FTE basis), for a student–teacher ratio of 17.1:1. The school's student body was 80.2% (279) White, 7.8% (27) two or more races, 5.2% (18) Black, 4.9% (5) Hispanic, 1.4% (5) Asian, 0.3% (1) American Indian / Alaska Native and 0.3% (1) Native Hawaiian / Pacific Islander.

== Academics ==
There are many courses to learn at GCCS. The students have competed in local, regional and national academic/fine arts and sports competitions. Each subject is taught and viewed through a biblical perspective. Outside the main courses include electives, such as flag football, volleyball, art, music, library, and PE each week. Although some of these, such as library, are only for the elementary classes, computer class and gym/PE are mandatory for high schoolers.

== Athletics ==
Gloucester County Christian School offers many sports; these include: Baseball, Basketball, Soccer, Softball, and Track and Field. They are a part of the Jersey United Christian Athletic Conference. The guys sports include: JV / Varsity Soccer, JV / Varsity Basketball, JV / Varsity Baseball, and Track and Field. The girls sports include: JV / Varsity Soccer, JV / Varsity Basketball, JV Softball, and Track and Field.

== Administration ==
The school's superintendent and lead administrator is Adam Capel. Principals are Mary Davis (for the elementary school) and Adam Capel (at the secondary school level). The school's administrative board is run by Hardingville Bible Church.
