= Glenorchy Cricket Club =

Cricket club based in the Glenorchy Municipality

- Founded: 1931
- Home ground: KGV Oval
- Colours: Black & White
- Coaches: Nathan Matthews/Richard Grubb
- Captain: Jyles Horne (1st grade), Ashton Cartledge (2nd Grade), Damien West (3rd Grade), Tarkyn Jones/Ryan Green/Lucas Kamaric (U18)
- TCA Titles: 16
- 2024-25: 9th (1st grade), 7th (2nd Grade), 5th (3rd grade), 4th (U18), Premiers (U16)

Glenorchy Cricket Club (GCC) also known as the "Magpies" represent Glenorchy in Tasmania's Premier Grade Cricket Competition.

Glenorchy Cricket Club was founded in 1931 and were at their most dominant in the 1950s, when they won a "four-in-a-row". GCC have won 16 Cricket Tasmania Premier League Premierships and a record 32 Club Championships. Glenorchy's most recent success was the back to back Premier League Club Championships 2012-13 & 2013–14, back to back 1st grade premierships 2012-13 & 2013–14, Kookaburra Cup 2014–15, CTPL & Statewide T20 titles 2013–14.

== Honours ==
TCA/ Cricket Tasmania Premier League Premierships: (16) 1941–42,1942–43,1948–49,1950–51,1951–52,1952–53,1953–54,1955–56,1956–57,1960–61,1962–63,1973–74,1975–76,1976–77, 2012–13, 2013–14.

== Current Squad ==
Men's 1st grade

- Ryan Graham-Daft
- Brandon Kopper
- Vishwa Deemantha
- Alex Rolle
- Tarkyn Jones
- Zac Pfitzner
- Jyles Horne
- Kai Martin
- Kane Lovell
- James Bowen
- Blake Sillifant
- Ryan Green
- Mansukh Singh
- Nikhil Chaudhary
- Lucas Kamaric
- Trent Le Rossignol
- Kasun Balasuriya
- Hugo_Burdon
- Bradley Simpson

Men's 2nd Grade

- Simon Palmer
- James Gambell
- Nathan Percey
- Kane Lovell
- Lucas Kamaric
- Blake Sillifant
- Ryan Green
- Ashton Cartledge
- Lachlan Greenhill
- Archie Shreeve
- James Bowen
- Naveen Panwar
- Zane West
- Archie Shreeve
- Jonty DeCotter
- Oliver Geeves
- Kai Martin
- William Ackroyd

Men's 3rd Grade

- Kodyn Mallinson
- Nathan Mallinson
- Kanwar Singh
- Bobby Nossiter
- Steve Sillifant
- Andrew Donaghy
- Billy Rolls
- Ronin Adams
- Jake Waller
- Xavier Donaghy
- Damien West
- Aiden Waller
- Mayank Kharbanda
- William Ackroyd

Under 18 Boys

- Kaiden Rozynski
- Hunter Kamaric
- Tarkyn Jones
- Zac Pfitzner
- Billy Rolls
- Lucas Kamaric
- Charlie Cockshutt
- Logan Hunt
- Nathan Shelverton
- Jake Waller
- Ethan Lacy
- Ryan Green
- William Ackroyd
- Rhylee Roberts
- Joshua Wilson

Under 16 boys

- Kodyn Mallinson
- Jonty DeCotter
- Kai Martin
- Bobby Nossiter
- Jake Beams
- Zane West
- Lucas Hodgson
- Jake Waller
- Rhylee Roberts
- Ethan Lacy
- Ronin Adams
- Xavier Donaghy
- William Turner
- Tom Ackroyd
- Jay Mills
- Gurtaj singh

Women's 2nd Grade

- Demi-May Rooke
- Layla Waight
- Cassie Blair
- Natalie Smedley
- Kirsten Allen
- Angel Green
- Addysen Nossiter
- Samantha Phillips
- Sidney Fletcher
- Emma Abrahams
- Mikayla Sillifant
- Teena Sillifant
- Lucy Schiebel
- Molly Dean
- Zoe Bird
- Caitlin Philpott
- Sophie Brazendale
- Belinda Raphael
