= Global Certification Commission =

Independent body of the WHO for the eradication of polio

- Abbreviation: GCC
- Formation: February 16, 1995; 31 years ago
- Legal status: Active
- Headquarters: Geneva, Switzerland
- Parent organization: World Health Organization

The World Health Organization (WHO) created the Global Commission for the Certification of the Eradication of Poliomyelitis (commonly known as the Global Certification Commission or GCC) in 1995 to independently verify the eradication of wild poliovirus. The GCC certified the worldwide eradication of indigenous wild poliovirus type 2 on 20 September 2015, and wild poliovirus type 3 on 17 October 2019. In addition, five of the six World Health Organization Regions certified their status as free of indigenous transmission of all three serotypes of wild poliovirus (types 1, 2, and 3): the Americas in 1994, Western Pacific in 2000, Europe in 2002, Southeast Asia in 2014, and Africa in 2020.

Afghanistan and Pakistan are the only remaining polio endemic countries, with polio cases caused by type 1 wild poliovirus reported in 2021. Since 1988, international efforts led by the Global Polio Eradication Initiative have reduced poliomyelitis cases caused by wild poliovirus by over 99.99% using vaccination.

== History ==
In the 1980s, Rotary International led a successful campaign to end polio in the Americas with support from the US Centers for Disease Control and Prevention(CDC) (for technical assistance, including surveillance), Pan American Health Organization (PAHO)/World Health Organization (WHO) (for coordination and project management), United Nations Children's Fund (UNICEF) (for vaccine procurement), and other funding partners. Demonstration of the potential for eradication by the Americas supported interest in global polio eradication. In 1988, the World Health Assembly, the governing body of the World Health Organization, approved Resolution WHA41.28, which committed to global eradication of poliomyelitis by the year 2000. By 1993, coordination of global activities on polio eradication by the Global Polio Eradication Initiative (GPEI) involved 4 spearheading partners led by the WHO Secretariat - WHO, UNICEF, Rotary International, and CDC - and the GPEI received broad support from world leaders, development agencies, and both public and private donors. The list of core GPEI partners expanded to include the Gates Foundation in 2013 and GAVI in 2020.

Following the first regional certification of polio eradication in 1994 by the Americas, the WHO convened the first meeting of the Global Certification Commission in Geneva, Switzerland, on 16–17 February 1995. The commission was initially established as a 13-person board and assigned the responsibility of delineating the criterion for the verification and certification of eradication of the wild poliovirus.

The GCC certified the global eradication of wild poliovirus type 2 (WPV2) at its 14th meeting on 20 September 2015. The GCC certified the global eradication of wild poliovirus type 3 (WPV3) at its 20th meeting on 17 October 2019. Wild poliovirus type 1 is the only type of wild poliovirus that remains uninterrupted globally. The GCC held its 21st meeting in July 2021.

== Structure ==
The Global Certification Commission is the top-level decision-making body of a three-tier process. Each WHO member state's national polio program appoints a National Certification Committee (NCC). These NCCs meet annually until national certification to report on the status of national polio surveillance and elimination. A country is regarded as polio free or non-endemic if no cases have been detected by high-quality surveillance for a year. The Regional Certification Committees (RCC) meet annually until regional certification to evaluate the reports from the NCCs. The six RCCs, which are panels of WHO-appointed experts who are independent of both the NCCs and the GPEI, are charged with certification of their WHO region. The chairs of the six regional committees comprise the Global Certification Commission, which meets as needed for global decision making.

== Regional certification ==
The six WHO regions with a marker for the locations of WHO regional headquarters, which may be different from the Regional Certification Commission headquarters: Africa Americas / Eastern Mediterranean Europe / South East Asia Western Pacific

The Region of the Americas certified polio eradication in 1994. As part of the regional certification process, the expert committee established the criteria of "verification of the absence of virologically confirmed indigenous poliomyelitis cases in the Americas for a period of at least 3 years under circumstances of adequate surveillance," which the GCC adopted as its criteria at its first meeting. The criteria for adequate surveillance included finding and examining at least one case of nonpolio acute flaccid paralysis per 100,000 children under 15 years old. A statistical analysis of regional data and mathematical infection transmission modeling supported the criteria. The modeling showed that with a perfect surveillance system, any wild poliovirus transmission would be detected within 3–4 years with very high (e.g., 95%) confidence.

With the criteria established, the GCC resolved to certify each of the remaining regions until the disease was eradicated globally. The Western Pacific regional certification occurred in 2000 and Europe certified polio eradication in 2002. The Southeast Asia region certified polio eradication in 2014.

In 1996, African nations signed the Yaoundé Declaration on Polio Eradication in Africa, and Nelson Mandela started the "Kick Polio out of Africa" campaign. In Africa, the most recent region to certify polio eradication in 2020, regional certification efforts began in 1998, when the WHO regional director for Africa appointed 16 people to the Africa Regional Certification Commission (ARCC). Based in Yaoundé, Cameroon, and led by Rose Leke as chairperson as of 2020, the group was tasked with overseeing the eradication effort in the Africa WHO region. The independent body is the only organisation recognized to certify that polio has been eradicated from the region. On 25 August 2020, the ARCC declared that wild poliovirus has been eliminated in its region which includes 47 countries spanning most of Africa. The last reported case of polio in the region was on 21 August 2016, in Borno, Nigeria. Among the conditions for certification of the region was a requirement that 95% of the population be immunised.

The Eastern Mediterranean Region is the only WHO region remaining that has not certified wild poliovirus eradication. The region includes 22 countries spanning from Morocco to Pakistan, several of which have individually eradicated the disease. This region experiences significant political unrest, humanitarian crises, forced displacement, and deterioration of health care systems, which hinder eradication efforts. Syria, Yemen, and Somalia are categorized as very-high-risk, and Iraq, Sudan, and Libya are categorized as high-risk, while Pakistan and Afghanistan are the only countries in which the disease remains endemic as of 2019. Since 2007, people administering polio vaccines have been the target of violence in Pakistan. A 2011 US Central Intelligence Agency operation used a hepatitis vaccination program as a cover to search DNA evidence to confirm the location of Osama bin Laden. Following his killing the same year, Islamist insurgents in the region have become more hostile to vaccination efforts. More recently, the hostility has been exasperated by the United States' expansion of the use of drone strikes in northwest Pakistan; in June 2012, Mullah Nazir, leader of the Federally Administered Tribal Agencies, distributed leaflets calling for a ban on polio vaccination with the goal of persuading the US to stop drone strikes in the area.

== Support from modeling ==
Building on modeling used to support regional polio certification in the Americas, additional modeling explored how different characteristics of the three serotypes of wild poliovirus and the specific conditions in the countries with the last reported regional and global cases could impact changes in confidence about no circulation with increasing time since the last reported case. Specific modeling studies for Nigeria, which reported the last wild poliovirus cases in Africa, supported African regional certification. Modeling of the countries with the last type 3 wild poliovirus cases (i.e., Nigeria, Pakistan and Afghanistan) supported global certification of type 3 wild poliovirus eradication.

Sensitivity of monitoring for circulation can be improved by environmental surveillance, which relies on sampling sewage. The availability of environmental surveillance data can shorten the time required to achieve high confidence about no circulation of poliovirus in a population, but this depends on the quality of polio surveillance.
