= Gateway Community Church =

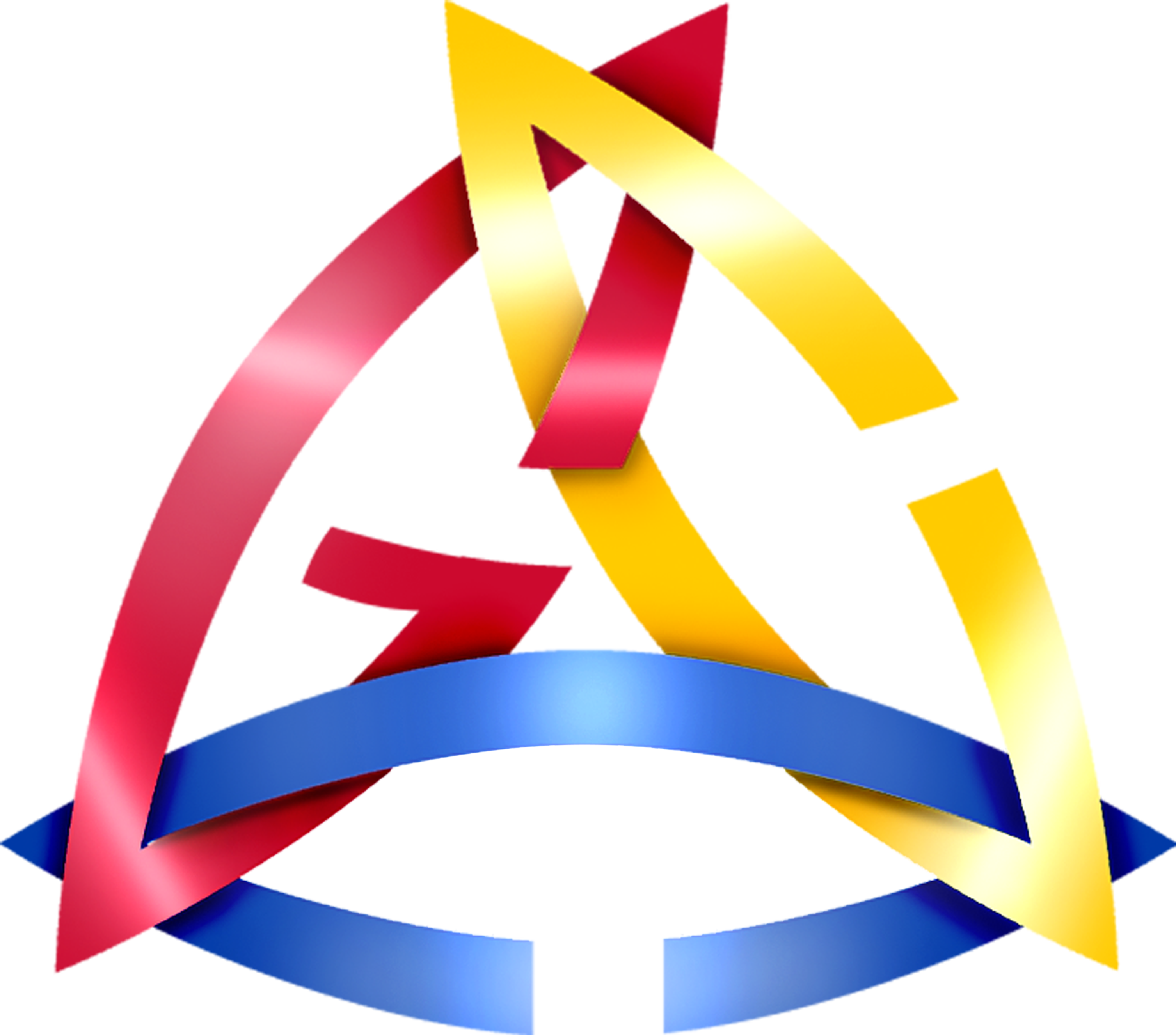
- Gateway Concentrix symbolizing the three major directions: Need Meeting, Nurture, Natural
- Gateway Community Church
- 16.415°N 120.598°E
- Location: 4th Fl., ECCO Bldg., 43 Assumption Road., Baguio CIty, Philippines, 2600
- Denomination: Non-denominational
- Website: www.gatewaychurch.com.ph

History
- Founder: Rev. Rodolfo D. De Guia

The Gateway Community Church is a non-denominational church located in Baguio, Philippines.

== History ==
Gateway Community Church was founded by Senior Pastor Rodolfo 'Sohl' De Guia on April 7, 2002.

Rodolfo was studying at seminary in 2002 and began GCC with a small group of people. In 2008, the Church gained an average attendance of 175 people and started to hold services at three different locations. Dr. Anthony Dela Fuente gave the church its name "The Little Big Church" and lauded GCC as an Emerging Church.

The Gateway Performing Arts pose for a break after the 9th anniversary production performance

In late 2009, the Church moved to larger premises at Legarda Rd.

The number of worshippers now averages from 220-270 every Sunday. This growth is attributed to intentional community engagement and dedicated discipleship. Weekly coaching of cell leaders and the Ladder of Success program are in place to train and prepare all members for discipleship. In three years, over 30 cell groups were created and new ones were born each week.

In 2015, the GCC released a series of one-hour podcasts.
