= Viral shedding =

Dissemination of mature virions from host cell

Viral shedding is the expulsion and release of virus progeny following successful reproduction during a host cell infection. Once replication has been completed and the host cell is exhausted of all resources in making viral progeny, the viruses may begin to leave the cell by several methods.

The term is variously used to refer to viral particles shedding from a single cell, from one part of the body into another, and from a body into the environment, where the virus may infect another host.

== Means ==
=== Shedding from a cell into extracellular space ===
==== Budding (through cell envelope) ====
Generic viral budding

"Budding" through the cell envelope into extracellular space is most effective for viruses that require their own envelope. In effect, the viral envelope is built from a part of the host cell membrane. Examples for viruses that shed through budding include HIV, HSV, SARS, and smallpox. When beginning the budding process, the viral nucleocapsid interacts with a certain region of the host cell membrane. During this interaction, the glycosylated viral envelope protein inserts itself into the cell membrane. In order to successfully bud from the host cell, the nucleocapsid of the virus must form a connection with the cytoplasmic tails of envelope proteins. Though budding does not immediately destroy the host cell, this process will slowly use up the cell membrane and eventually lead to the cell's demise. Indeed, some viruses such as mammarenaviruses won’t use up the cell membrane, instead it maintains to complete its lifecycle. This is also how antiviral responses are able to detect virus-infected cells.

EPRS1 acts, in human cells, as a proviral factor in mammarenaviruses infection, including LCMV, JUNV, and LASV, and its inhibition using halofuginon compound, a prolyl domain inhibitor, completely abolishes the viral infection by interrupting viral assembly and budding.

Budding has been most extensively studied for viruses of eukaryotes. However, it has been demonstrated that viruses infecting prokaryotes of the domain Archaea also employ this mechanism of virion release.

==== Apoptosis (cell destruction) ====
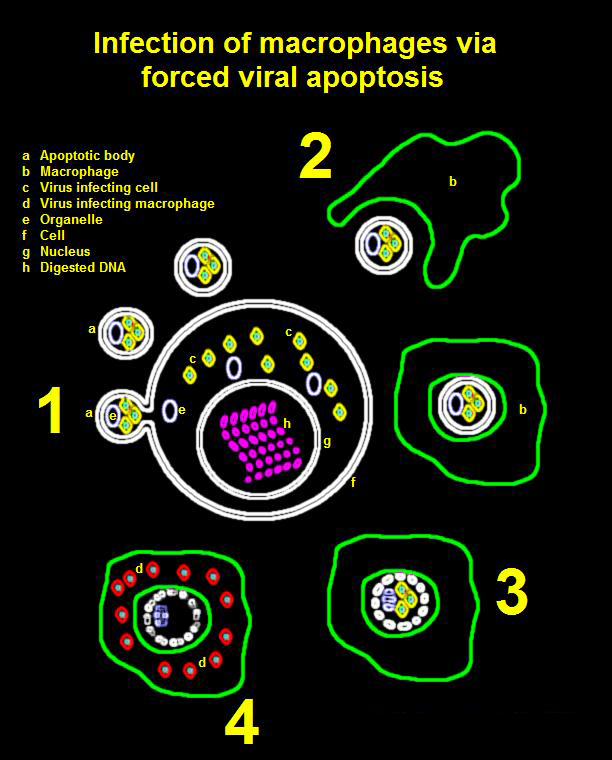
Virus forcing cell to undergo apoptosis to infect macrophages

Animal cells are programmed to self-destruct when they are under viral attack or damaged in some other way. By forcing the cell to undergo apoptosis or cell suicide, release of progeny into the extracellular space is possible. However, apoptosis does not necessarily result in the cell simply popping open and spilling its contents into the extracellular space. Rather, apoptosis is usually controlled and results in the cell's genome being chopped up, before apoptotic bodies of dead cell material clump off the cell to be absorbed by macrophages. This is a good way for a virus to get into macrophages either to infect them or simply travel to other tissues in the body.

Although this process is primarily used by non-enveloped viruses, enveloped viruses may also use this. HIV is an example of an enveloped virus that exploits this process for the infection of macrophages.

==== Exocytosis (cell release) ====
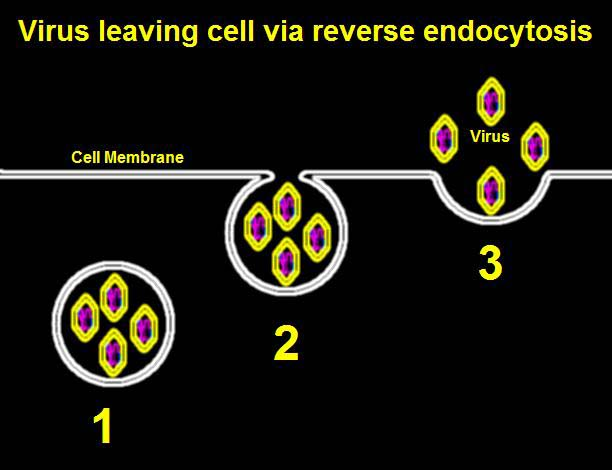
Virus leaving via exocytosis

Viruses that have envelopes that come from nuclear or endosomal membranes can leave the cell via exocytosis, in which the host cell is not destroyed. Viral progeny are synthesized within the cell, and the host cell's transport system is used to enclose them in vesicles; the vesicles of virus progeny are carried to the cell membrane and then released into the extracellular space. This is used primarily by non-enveloped viruses, although enveloped viruses display this too. An example is the use of recycling viral particle receptors in the enveloped varicella-zoster virus.

== Contagiousness ==
A human with a viral disease can be contagious if they are shedding virus particles, even if they are unaware of doing so. Some viruses such as HSV-2 (which produces genital herpes) can cause asymptomatic shedding and therefore spread undetected from person to person, as no fever or other hints reveal the contagious nature of the host.

== See also ==
- Vaccine shedding - a form of viral shedding following administration of an attenuated (or "live virus") vaccine
