= MECACAR =

Multi-national immunization program

Operation MECACAR (currently known as MECACAR New Millennium) is a multi-national immunization program launched in 1995 by the World Health Organization to coordinate polio vaccination efforts (currently it is also used to coordinated measles and rubella vaccination efforts). The name of the operation was derived from the names of the regions participating in the operation: Eastern Mediterranean, Caucasus, Central Asian Republics and Russia. Currently, 18 countries are participating and more than 60 million children have been vaccinated.

== Concept ==
The operation was launched to "maximize the geographic area covered and the number of children targeted simultaneously for mass vaccination with OPV". It introduced "National Immunization Days", held at the same dates in bordering member countries; and also coordinated the efforts of different laboratories.

== History ==
=== MECACAR New Millennium ===
After Europe was declared polio-free in 2002, MECACAR's objectives became maintaining polio-free status in the region and also achieve measles and rubella elimination. On May 17, 2007, the MECACAR New Millennium declaration was signed. The event took place in Geneva.
