= Herpes virus =

Herpes virus may refer to:

- Any member of the large family of DNA viruses known as Herpesviridae
  - Human herpesviruses, nine types of herpesviruses that can cause diseases in humans
    - Herpes simplex virus 1 and 2, responsible for herpes simplex infections
    - Human alphaherpesvirus 3, also called varicella-zoster virus, responsible for chickenpox and shingles
    - Human gammaherpesvirus 4, or Epstein–Barr virus, one of the most common viruses which can cause various diseases
    - Human betaherpesvirus 5
    - Roseolovirus, a genus that includes three human herpesviruses:
      - Human herpesvirus 6, the collective name for Human betaherpesvirus 6A and Human betaherpesvirus 6B
      - Human betaherpesvirus 7
    - Human gammaherpesvirus 8, or Kaposi's sarcoma-associated herpesvirus

== See also ==
- Herpes simplex, any infection caused by Herpes simplex virus 1 or 2
  - Herpes labialis, also called cold sores, painful blistering of the lip
  - Genital herpes, a sexually transmitted infection
  - Category:Herpes simplex virus–associated diseases, overview of diseases associated with a Herpes simplex virus
