= CMV423 =

Chemical compound

Clinical data
- Other names: CMV-423; RPR-111423

Legal status
- Legal status: Investigational

Identifiers
- IUPAC name: 2-Chloro-3-(pyridin-3-yl)-5,6,7,8-tetrahydroindolizine-1-carboxamide
- CAS Number: 186829-19-6
- PubChem CID: 489128
- ChemSpider: 428515
- UNII: PDX37M872C
- CompTox Dashboard (EPA): DTXSID40333187

Chemical and physical data
- Formula: C_{14}H_{14}ClN_{3}O
- Molar mass: 275.74 g·mol^{−1}
- 3D model (JSmol): Interactive image
- SMILES: c1cc(cnc1)c2c(c(c3n2CCCC3)C(=O)N)Cl
- InChI: InChI=1S/C14H14ClN3O/c15-12-11(14(16)19)10-5-1-2-7-18(10)13(12)9-4-3-6-17-8-9/h3-4,6,8H,1-2,5,7H2,(H2,16,19); Key:KNGXENHWYNLKBU-UHFFFAOYSA-N

CMV423 (2-chloro-3-pyridin-3-yl-5,6,7,8-tetrahydroindolizine-1-carboxamide) is an experimental antiviral drug that has been studied for the treatment of cytomegalovirus (CMV) infection and human herpesvirus 6 (HHV-6) infection. The drug was investigated by Sanofi-Aventis, but its development was discontinued by 2018 before entering clinical trials.
