= Human herpesvirus 6B =

Virus classification
- (unranked): Virus
- Realm: Duplodnaviria
- Kingdom: Heunggongvirae
- Phylum: Peploviricota
- Class: Herviviricetes
- Order: Herpesvirales
- Family: Orthoherpesviridae
- Genus: Roseolovirus
- Species: Roseolovirus humanbeta6b

Synonyms
- Human betaherpesvirus 6B; Human herpesvirus 6B

Species of virus

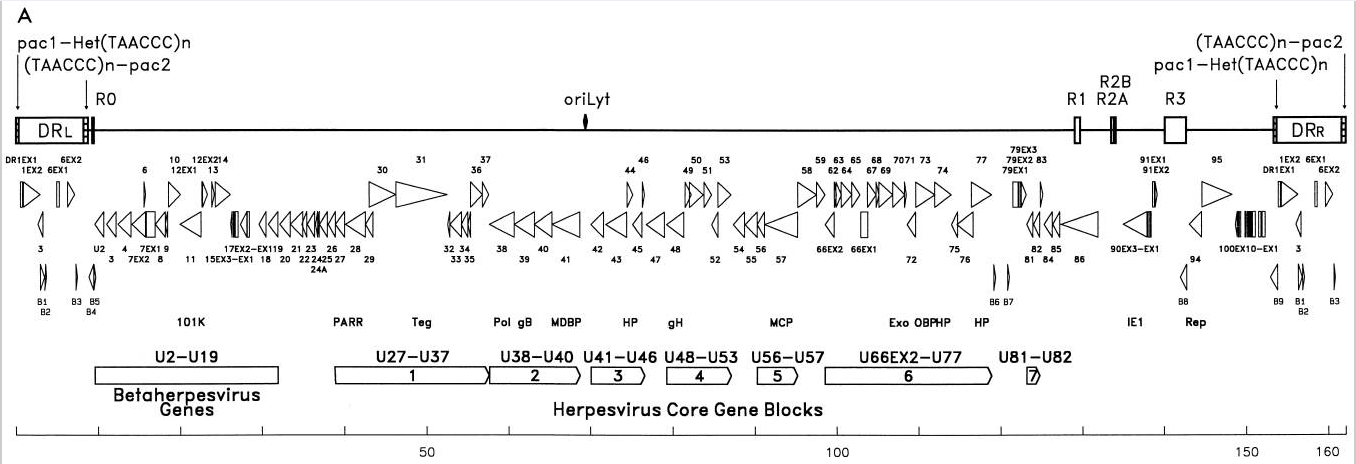
HHV-6B genome map (click to enlarge)

Human herpesvirus 6B (HHV-6B) is a species of virus in the genus Roseolovirus, subfamily Betaherpesvirinae, family Herpesviridae, and order Herpesvirales.

== Taxonomy ==
In 1992 the two variants were recognised within Human herpesvirus 6 on the basis of differing restriction endonuclease cleavages, monoclonal antibody reactions, and growth patterns. In 2012 these two variants were officially recognised as distinct species by the International Committee on Taxonomy of Viruses. Despite now being recognised as paraphyletic, the name Human herpesvirus 6 still sees usage in clinical contexts.

== Pathology ==
Human herpesvirus 6B affects humans. Primary infection with this virus is the cause of the common childhood illness exanthema subitum (also known as roseola infantum or sixth disease). Additionally, reactivation is common in transplant recipients, which can cause several clinical manifestations such as encephalitis, bone marrow suppression, and pneumonitis.
