= Murid herpesvirus 8 =

Virus classification
- (unranked): Virus
- Realm: Duplodnaviria
- Kingdom: Heunggongvirae
- Phylum: Peploviricota
- Class: Herviviricetes
- Order: Herpesvirales
- Family: Orthoherpesviridae
- Genus: Muromegalovirus
- Species: Muromegalovirus muridbeta8

Synonyms
- Murid betaherpesvirus 8; Murid herpesvirus 8

Species of virus

Murid herpesvirus 8 (MuHV-8) is a species of virus in the genus Muromegalovirus, subfamily Betaherpesvirinae, family Orthoherpesviridae, and order Herpesvirales.
