= Miniopterus schreibersii herpesvirus =

Virus classification
- (unranked): Virus
- Realm: Duplodnaviria
- Kingdom: Heunggongvirae
- Phylum: Peploviricota
- Class: Herviviricetes
- Order: Herpesvirales
- Family: Orthoherpesviridae
- Genus: Quwivirus
- Species: Quwivirus miniopteridbeta1

Synonyms
- Miniopterid betaherpesvirus 1; Miniopterus schreibersii herpesvirus

Species of virus

Miniopterus schreibersii herpesvirus is a species of virus in the genus Quwivirus in the subfamily Betaherpesvirinae, family Orthoherpesviridae, and order Herpesvirales.
