= Guinea pig cytomegalovirus =

Virus classification
- (unranked): Virus
- Realm: Duplodnaviria
- Kingdom: Heunggongvirae
- Phylum: Peploviricota
- Class: Herviviricetes
- Order: Herpesvirales
- Family: Orthoherpesviridae
- Genus: Quwivirus
- Species: Quwivirus caviidbeta2

Synonyms
- Caviid betaherpesvirus 2; Guinea pig cytomegalovirus

Species of virus

Guinea pig cytomegalovirus is a species of virus in the genus Quwivirus, in the subfamily Betaherpesvirinae, family Orthoherpesviridae, and order Herpesvirales.
