= Rhesus cytomegalovirus =

Virus classification
- (unranked): Virus
- Realm: Duplodnaviria
- Kingdom: Heunggongvirae
- Phylum: Peploviricota
- Class: Herviviricetes
- Order: Herpesvirales
- Family: Orthoherpesviridae
- Genus: Cytomegalovirus
- Species: Cytomegalovirus macacinebeta3

Synonyms
- Macacine betaherpesvirus 3; Rhesus cytomegalovirus

Species of virus

Rhesus cytomegalovirus is a species of virus in the genus Cytomegalovirus, subfamily Betaherpesvirinae, family Orthoherpesviridae, and order Herpesvirales.
