= Elephant endotheliotropic herpesvirus 5 =

Virus classification
- (unranked): Virus
- Realm: Duplodnaviria
- Kingdom: Heunggongvirae
- Phylum: Peploviricota
- Class: Herviviricetes
- Order: Herpesvirales
- Family: Orthoherpesviridae
- Genus: Proboscivirus
- Species: Proboscivirus elephantidbeta5

Synonyms
- Elephant endotheliotropic herpesvirus 5; Elephantid betaherpesvirus 5

Species of virus

Elephant endotheliotropic herpesvirus 5 is a species of virus in the genus Proboscivirus, subfamily Betaherpesvirinae, family Orthoherpesviridae, and order Herpesvirales.
