= Elephant endotheliotropic herpesvirus =

Elephantid betaherpesvirus 1

Virus classification
- (unranked): Virus
- Realm: Duplodnaviria
- Kingdom: Heunggongvirae
- Phylum: Peploviricota
- Class: Herviviricetes
- Order: Herpesvirales
- Family: Orthoherpesviridae
- Genus: Proboscivirus
- Species: Elephantid betaherpesvirus 1

Synonyms
- Elephantid herpesvirus 1

Species of virus

Elephant endotheliotropic herpesviruses (EEHV) are herpesviruses that infect elephants. They can cause a highly fatal hemorrhagic disease when transmitted to young Asian elephants. In African elephants, related forms of these viruses, which have been identified in wild populations, are generally benign, occasionally surfacing to cause small growths or lesions. However, some types of EEHV can cause a highly fatal disease in Asian elephants, which kills up to 80% of severely affected individuals. The disease can be treated with the rapid application of antiviral drugs, but this has only been effective in around a third of cases.

The first case of a fatal form of the disease was documented in 1990, though tissue samples from as early as the 1980s have since tested positive for the virus, and localized skin lesions in wild African elephants were recorded in the 1970s. Since 1995, there have been over fifty documented disease cases in North America and Europe, of which only nine have been successfully cured. Those affected are mostly young animals born in captivity, though a small number of older wild-born adults held in zoos have died, and a number of cases caused by the same pathogenic type of EEHV have been identified in both orphan and wild calves in Asian elephant populations.

== Virus and transmission ==
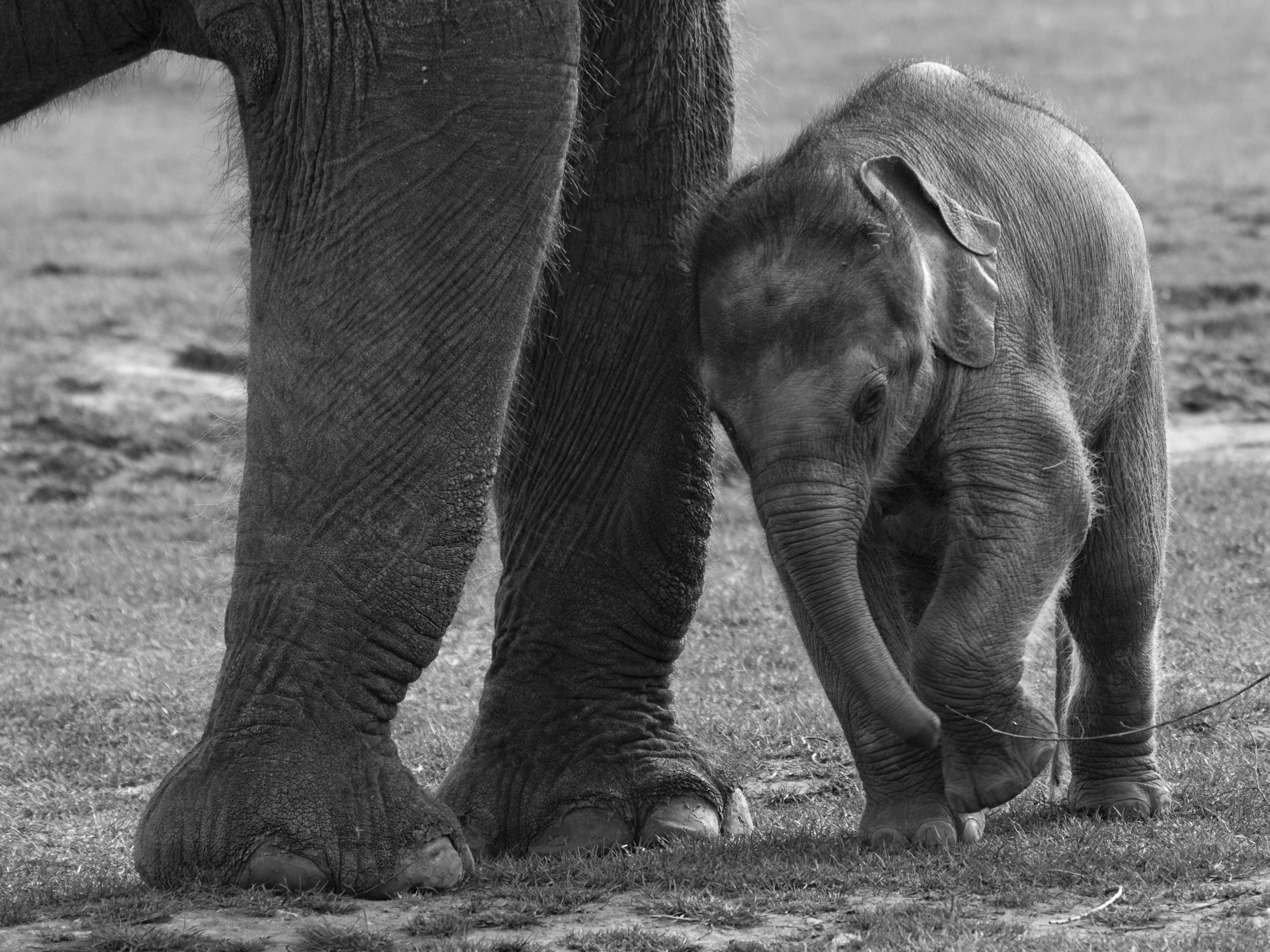
"Donaldson", a male Asian elephant calf at Whipsnade Zoo, died of EEHV in May 2009.

The EEHVs are members of the Proboscivirus genus, a novel clade most closely related to the mammalian betaherpesviruses that have been responsible for as many as 70 deaths of both zoo and wild Asian elephants worldwide, especially in young calves. There are currently six known species/types of the probosciviruses, and the most commonly encountered and most pathogenic form EEHV1 also has two chimeric subtypes, 1A and 1B, as well as numerous distinct strains.

EEHV1A (originally just known as EEHV1) was the first species/type identified, which causes an acute hemorrhagic disease with a very high mortality rate in Asian elephants. This form of the virus was originally believed to occur naturally in African elephants (occasionally producing skin nodules), and to be transmitted to Asian elephants within captivity, but more extensive studies have since largely disproved this concept because several other species/types of EEHV (e.g. EEHV2, EEHV3 and EEHV6) instead have been identified in African elephants. A second lethal subtype, EEHV1B, was identified in Asian elephants in 2001. EEHV3, EEHV4 and EEHV5 have also each been responsible for the deaths of at least one Asian elephant calf.

EEHV2 has caused hemorrhagic disease in several African elephants as reported by. Along with EEHV3 and EEHV6 it has also been found in pulmonary lymph nodes of several autopsied wild and zoo African elephants.

There are a further five or six species/types and varieties of elephant gammaherpesvirus (EGHVs) found in eye and genital secretions of many healthy Asian and African zoo elephants - e.g. EGHV1, EGHV2, EGHV3A, EGHV3B, EGHV4 and EGHV5 (also called Elephantid gammaherpesviruses EIHV3, EIHV4, EIHV5, EIHV6, ElHV9 and ElHV10) - all of which are classified in the subfamily Gammaherpesvirinae rather than Betaherpesvirinae. These viruses are neither closely related to the EEHVs, nor the known cause of any disease symptoms.

Studies have also detected both EEHV1A and EEHV1B as being shed in trunk wash secretions by healthy asymptomatic Asian zoo elephant herdmates of calves that previously had disease. and similarly for EEHV5. Thus, similar to saliva for most human and animal herpesviruses, the trunk secretions may be a source of transmission for EEHVs. Because of concerns about the origins of EEHV1 and evidence of cross-species transmission for EEHV3, long-term contact between Asian and African elephants has been discouraged, along with avoiding new contacts between young captive-born Asian elephants and wild-born Asian elephants, as the latter may be carriers of the disease. An analysis of a number of North American cases, which ruled out the direct transmission of the virus between any of the affected facilities studied, strongly supported the idea of a significant Asian carrier population. This is supported by the fact that some of the deceased calves had no possible contact with any African elephants. Artificial insemination is not believed to be a transmission factor, notes that when multiple calves of a single bull or cow elephant died at different times (even at the same facility) they nearly all had distinct strains of the virus, yet when two calves died or became infected at the same time at the same facility the pairs have always had identical virus strains. A program of enzyme-linked immunosorbent assay testing began in 2005, aiming to test blood samples from around a thousand elephants for antibodies to the virus in order to help identify carriers and possible transmission patterns.

== Effects and treatment ==
In benign infections found in some wild and captive African elephants, these viruses can affect either the skin or the pulmonary system. In the former case, it produces small pinkish nodules on the head and trunk in juveniles, which appear for a few weeks and then regress, suggesting an intermittently reactivated localized infection that mostly remains dormant. In the second case, it has been found in small white lung nodules on necropsy of many asymptomatic adults. These are both characteristic of EEHV2, EEHV3 and EEHV6.

In a fatal attack, however, it manifests very quickly. In a number of cases, death has occurred within 24 hours of the onset of the infection, while other cases do not last longer than around five days. The virus attacks endothelial cells, rupturing capillaries and causing blood loss and haemorrhaging; once this reaches the heart, the haemorrhage kills quickly through shock. Symptoms include lethargy and an unwillingness to eat, a rapid heartbeat, and decreased blood-cell count, as well as cyanosis of the tongue, mouth ulcers, and oedema of the head and trunk.

Rapid treatment with famciclovir, sustained for around a month, has appeared to cure eight calves infected with EEHV1; however, this treatment is very expensive, only partially effective, and relies on early identification of the infection.

A polymerase chain reaction test on a blood sample from affected animals will confirm a suspected case by identifying the viral DNA, though it is now common to start famciclovir treatment at the earliest possible moment rather than waiting for confirmation of the case. Prior to the development of the test, or in circumstances where it is not available, the disease may be misdiagnosed as any of a number of other conditions which have a quick onset leading to rapid death, including encephalomyocarditis and salmonellosis.

== History ==
The virus has been identified in the pulmonary nodules of African elephants as far back as the 1970s. The first recognised fatal case of EEHV in an Asian elephant was identified at the National Zoo in Washington, D.C., in 1995; testing on stored tissue samples was able to identify a number of earlier deaths as being due to the same virus. These cases have so far been identified as early as 1983. Since this date, there have been a total of 54 more cases in North America and Europe, nine of which were successfully treated. The May 2009 deaths of two calves at Whipsnade Zoo were not included in this calculation. This gives a fatality rate of over 80% among known symptomatic disease cases. In cases where antiviral medication was applied, treatment was effective in about one in three cases. As of 2005, there were twelve cases where famciclovir had been used, eight of which were fatal. As a fraction of the overall population, it has been calculated that of the 78 Asian elephants born in captivity in North America between 1978 and 2007, 19 are known to have died of EEHV, and five more were successfully treated with antiviral medication.

The affected animals are mostly young Asian elephants that had been born in captivity, with half the cases in North America being between the ages of one and four years (and three-quarters between one and eight years old). Some cases have affected newborns or adult elephants born in the wild (oldest aged 40 years), and three recorded cases have affected African elephants. The first documented fatal case for African elephants was Kijana, an eleven-month-old male in 1996. Since 2008, a number of cases have been attributed to EEHV1 among wild Asian elephants.

The first suspected case in Asia was in 1997, though it was not until the fifth suspected case that the presence of the virus could be confirmed. This case was reported in 2006, with the death of a young wild-born female calf at an elephant sanctuary in Cambodia. The virus was identified as part of the EEHV1 group, the same as previously identified in the North American and European captive populations. In 2013, nine lethal cases from India were extensively characterized and found to consist of a wide variety of genetically diverged strains of EEHV1A and EEHV1B matching the subtypes and genetic range of nearly all those found previously in Europe and North America. Cases attributed to EEHV1A and EEHV4 have also been reported in Thailand and there is both confirmed and anecdotal evidence for similar hemorrhagic disease deaths of between 16 and 30 more calves in Asian countries including Thailand, India, Nepal, Myanmar and Indonesia within the past five years. Thus, this is not just a disease of captive elephants, but is endogenous to and possibly rampant in Asian elephants in the wild also. Further research has been noted as "urgently required" to study the situation in regions with wild Asian elephant populations.

On 12 June 2019 it was reported that in Chester Zoo the 2-year-old Indian elephant calf Indali Hi Way had fully recovered from EEHV, after numerous treatments over 2 weeks, and that there is now hope of a vaccine for EEHV. In 2020, a 1-year-old Asian elephant named Ajay, from the Rosamond Gifford Zoo in Syracuse, New York, which was popular in the area, died from the virus. In July 2024, Dublin Zoo reported two deaths from the virus. Avani, who was 8 years old, and Zinda, who was 7, both died from the virus.

In November 2024, a young African elephant "Bumi" died at Ouwehands Dierenpark in Rhenen in the Netherlands. Later that month two calves named "Nagarr" and "Ka Yan" died in the Dutch zoo Wildlands in Emmen. On 11th of December, the first test took place of a new vaccine developed by the University of Utrecht against the virus variant that only affects Asian elephants.
