= Murine cytomegalovirus =

Virus classification
- (unranked): Virus
- Realm: Duplodnaviria
- Kingdom: Heunggongvirae
- Phylum: Peploviricota
- Class: Herviviricetes
- Order: Herpesvirales
- Family: Orthoherpesviridae
- Genus: Muromegalovirus
- Species: Muromegalovirus muridbeta1

Synonyms
- Murid betaherpesvirus 1; Murine cytomegalovirus

Species of virus

Murine cytomegalovirus is a species of virus in the genus Muromegalovirus, subfamily Betaherpesvirinae, family Orthoherpesviridae, and order Herpesvirales.
