= Cercopithecine herpesvirus 5 =

Virus classification
- (unranked): Virus
- Realm: Duplodnaviria
- Kingdom: Heunggongvirae
- Phylum: Peploviricota
- Class: Herviviricetes
- Order: Herpesvirales
- Family: Orthoherpesviridae
- Genus: Cytomegalovirus
- Species: Cytomegalovirus cercopithecinebeta5

Synonyms
- Cercopithecine betaherpesvirus 5; Cercopithecine herpesvirus 5

Species of virus

Cercopithecine herpesvirus 5 (CeHV-5) is a species of virus in the genus Cytomegalovirus, subfamily Betaherpesvirinae, family Orthoherpesviridae, and order Herpesvirales.

African green monkeys (Chlorocebus spp.) serve as natural hosts.
