= Aotine herpesvirus 1 =

Virus classification
- (unranked): Virus
- Realm: Duplodnaviria
- Kingdom: Heunggongvirae
- Phylum: Peploviricota
- Class: Herviviricetes
- Order: Herpesvirales
- Family: Orthoherpesviridae
- Genus: Cytomegalovirus
- Species: Cytomegalovirus aotinebeta1

Synonyms
- Aotine bethaherpesvirus 1; Aotine herpesvirus 1; Herpesvirus aotus 1

Species of virus

Aotine herpesvirus 1 (AoHV-1) is a species of virus in the genus Cytomegalovirus, subfamily Betaherpesvirinae, family Orthoherpesviridae, and order Herpesvirales.

Night monkeys (Aotus spp.) serve as natural hosts.
