= Human herpesvirus 6A =

Virus classification
- (unranked): Virus
- Realm: Duplodnaviria
- Kingdom: Heunggongvirae
- Phylum: Peploviricota
- Class: Herviviricetes
- Order: Herpesvirales
- Family: Orthoherpesviridae
- Genus: Roseolovirus
- Species: Roseolovirus humanbeta6a

Synonyms
- Human betaherpesvirus 6A; Human herpesvirus 6A

Species of virus

Human herpesvirus 6A (HHV-6A) is a species of virus in the genus Roseolovirus, subfamily Betaherpesvirinae, family Herpesviridae, and order Herpesvirales.

== HHV-6A and infertility ==
- A 2016 study showed that 43% of women with unexplained infertility tested positive for HHV-6A while 0% of women in the fertile control group tested positive. HHV-6A was found present in endrometrial epithelial cells from women with unexplained infertility.
- A 2018 study reports the prevalence of HHV-6A in endometrial biopsies among women experiencing recurrent implantation failure after IVF/ET compared to control groups.
- A 2019 study confirmed the presence of HHV-6A infection in 40% of idiopathic infertile women. Identifying the effect of HHV-6A infection on endometrial immune status opens up a new perspectives on fertility care. It's possible to choose antiviral therapies and non-hormonal approaches for women with unexplained infertility characterized by HHV-6A to increase their pregnancy rate.

== Taxonomy ==
In 1992 the two variants were recognised within Human herpesvirus 6 on the basis of differing restriction endonuclease cleavages, monoclonal antibody reactions, and growth patterns. In 2012 these two variants were officially recognised as distinct species by the International Committee on Taxonomy of Viruses. Despite now being recognised as paraphyletic, the name Human herpesvirus 6 still sees usage in clinical contexts.

== Pathology ==
Human herpesvirus 6A affects humans and includes several adult-derived strains. Its disease spectrum is not well defined, although it is thought by some to be more neurovirulent than Human herpesvirus 6B.
