= Murid herpesvirus 2 =

Virus classification
- (unranked): Virus
- Realm: Duplodnaviria
- Kingdom: Heunggongvirae
- Phylum: Peploviricota
- Class: Herviviricetes
- Order: Herpesvirales
- Family: Orthoherpesviridae
- Genus: Muromegalovirus
- Species: Muromegalovirus muridbeta2

Synonyms
- Murid betaherpesvirus 2; Murid herpesvirus 2

Species of virus

Murid herpesvirus 2 (MuHV-2) is a species of virus in the genus Muromegalovirus, subfamily Betaherpesvirinae, family Orthoherpesviridae, and order Herpesvirales.
