= Thomas Hildebrandt =

German researcher

Thomas B. Hildebrandt (born 1963, Berlin, Germany) is a German veterinarian researcher dedicated to species conservation. He heads the Department of Reproduction Management at the Leibniz Institute for Zoo and Wildlife Research (IZW) in Berlin and holds a full professorship for Wildlife Reproduction Medicine at the veterinary faculty of the Freie Universität Berlin.

== Research ==
Thomas Hildebrandt pioneered the use of ultrasound in zoo and wild animal species, especially for reproductive research and Assisted Reproductive Technologies (ART) since the 1990s. He was involved in the discovery and description of the elephant endotheliotropic herpesvirus (EEHV) and, beyond basic research on elephant biology and reproduction, established a successful artificial insemination program for zoo elephants including the use of wild African elephant semen which led to the birth of 38 African and Asian elephant calves by 2021 Thomas Hildebrandt leads the ongoing endeavour “BioRescue” of an international team of researchers to save the northern white rhinoceros (Ceratotherium simum cottoni) from extinction, of which currently only two infertile females remain, by using Assisted Reproductive Technologies and stem cell-based approaches. This ambitious project receives funding by the BMBF and is aimed at being used as a blueprint for the rescue of further critically endangered species.

== Awards ==
- Panda Personality of the Year (2019)
- Conservation Legacy Award, Pittsburg Zoo & PPG Aquarium, USA (2015)

== Media ==
- 24.11.2021 | BBC Northern white rhinos: Longleat's rhinos help species avoid extinction
- 14.04.2020 | BBC Northern white rhinos: The audacious plan that could save a species
- 08.12.2019 | BBC These Two Rhinos Are The Last Of Their Kind | Seven Worlds, One Planet | BBC Earth
- 23.08.2019 | The Standard: Experts harvest eggs to save dying rhino species
- 04.07.2018 | The New York Times: Rhino Embryos Made in Lab to Save Nearly Extinct Subspecies
