= Dharam Ablashi =

American biomedical researcher (1931–2023)

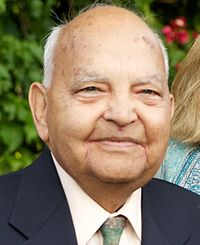

Dharam Vir Ablashi (October 8, 1931 – June 26, 2023) was an American biomedical researcher born in Lahore. He is best known for his co-discovery of Human herpesvirus 6 (HHV-6), an immunosuppressive and neurotropic virus that can cause encephalitis and seizures during a primary infection or when reactivated from latency in immunosuppressed patients.

Ablashi earned his doctorate in veterinary medicine at Panjab University Veterinary College. He then received his diploma in bacteriology from the Indian Veterinary Research Institute before moving to the United States, where he earned his Master of Science degree in pathology and virology at the University of Rhode Island. He died on June 26, 2023, at the age of 91.

== HHV-6 Research ==
In 1969, Ablashi became a researcher at the National Cancer Institute, NIH. In 1986, while working in Dr. Robert Gallo’s lab, Ablashi, S. Zaki Salahuddin and Gallo together discovered HHV-6; later found to cause Roseola, an infantile disease. He retired from NCI in 1992, but continued serving as an adjunct professor of microbiology at Georgetown University School of Medicine until 2008. He co-edited three books on Human Herpesvirus 6 and served as a consultant to various biomedical companies; as well as NASA, W.H.O. and the United Nations. In 1994 he became coordinator of DNA virus studies in the laboratory of Cellular and Molecular Virology at the National Cancer Institute.

In 2004, Ablashi became the first scientific director of the HHV-6 Foundation. In 2005, he established the fHHV-6 & 7 repository of reagents at the HHV-6 Foundation with the help of biospecimen donations from international colleagues.
