= Drill monkey cytomegalovirus =

Virus classification
- (unranked): Virus
- Realm: Duplodnaviria
- Kingdom: Heunggongvirae
- Phylum: Peploviricota
- Class: Herviviricetes
- Order: Herpesvirales
- Family: Orthoherpesviridae
- Genus: Cytomegalovirus
- Species: Cytomegalovirus mandrillinebeta1

Synonyms
- Drill monkey cytomegalovirus; Mandrilline betaherpesvirus 1

Species of virus

Drill monkey cytomegalovirus is a species of virus in the family Orthoherpesviridae.
