= Mouse thymic virus =

Virus classification
- (unranked): Virus
- Realm: Duplodnaviria
- Kingdom: Heunggongvirae
- Phylum: Peploviricota
- Class: Herviviricetes
- Order: Herpesvirales
- Family: Orthoherpesviridae
- Genus: Roseolovirus
- Species: Roseolovirus muridbeta3

Synonyms
- Mouse thymic virus; Murid betaherpesvirus 3

Species of virus

Mouse thymic virus is a species of virus in the family Orthoherpesviridae.
