= CMV polyradiculomyelopathy =

- Specialty: Neurology

CMV polyradiculomyelopathy (PRAM) is one of the five distinct neurological syndromes caused by CMV in HIV/AIDS. It causes subacute ascending lower extremity weakness with paresthesias and radicular pain, hyporeflexia or areflexia, and urinary retention. It has been suggested that CMV polyradiculomyelopathy should be treated with both ganciclovir and foscarnet in patients who develop the disease while taking either of these drugs.
