= Neurotropic virus =

Species of virus that infects nerve tissue

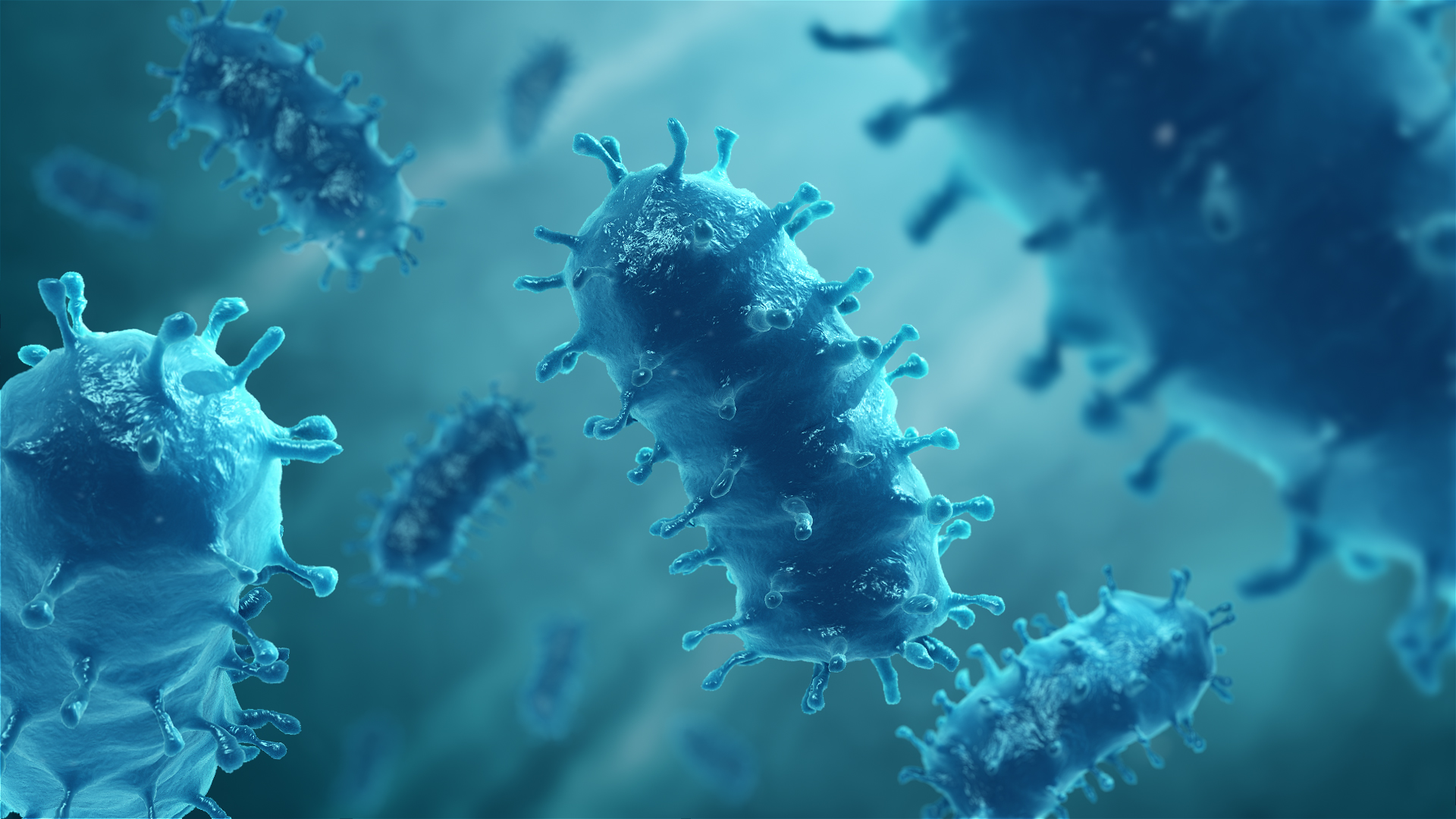
3D animation showing a rabies virus, an example of a neurotropic virus

A neurotropic virus is a virus that is capable of infecting nerve tissue.

== Terminology ==
A neurotropic virus is said to be neuroinvasive if it is capable of accessing or entering the nervous system and neurovirulent if it is capable of causing disease within the nervous system. Both terms are often applied to central nervous system infections, although some neurotropic viruses are highly neuroinvasive for the peripheral nervous system (e.g. herpes simplex virus). Important neuroinvasive viruses include poliovirus, which is highly neurovirulent but weakly neuroinvasive, and rabies virus, which is highly neurovirulent but requires tissue trauma (often resulting from an animal bite) to become neuroinvasive. Using these definitions, herpes simplex virus is highly neuroinvasive for the peripheral nervous system and rarely neuroinvasive for the central nervous system, but in the latter case may cause herpesviral encephalitis and is therefore considered highly neurovirulent. Many arthropod-borne neurotropic viruses, like West Nile virus, spread to the brain primarily via the blood system by crossing the blood–brain barrier in what is called hematogenous dissemination.

== Examples ==
Neurotropic viruses that cause infection include Japanese Encephalitis, Venezuelan Equine Encephalitis, and California encephalitis viruses; polio, coxsackie, echo, mumps, measles, influenza and rabies, as well as diseases caused by members of the family Herpesviridae such as herpes simplex, varicella-zoster, Epstein–Barr, cytomegalovirus and HHV-6 viruses. All seven of the known human coronaviruses are neurotropic, the common cold viruses mainly in vulnerable populations while the more virulent SARS-CoV-1, MERS, and SARS-CoV-2 frequently attack the nervous systems (primarily in animal models).

Those causing latent infection include herpes simplex and varicella-zoster viruses. Those causing slow virus infection include measles virus, rubella and JC viruses, and retroviruses such as human T-lymphotropic virus 1 and HIV.

== Links to neurodegenerative disease ==
A long-standing hypothesis in neurology, sometimes termed the "pathogen hypothesis" of neurodegeneration, proposes that chronic or reactivating neurotropic infections contribute to the pathogenesis of several age-related neurodegenerative conditions such as Alzheimer's disease (AD). This hypothesis was first articulated in the 1990s and has gained renewed attention since a series of mechanistic and epidemiological studies were published from 2018 onward.

However, this viral hypothesis of AD has been contested as well. Reviewers have noted that a large majority of adults harbor latent herpesviruses without developing dementia, implying that infection is at most one of several interacting risk factors, rather than a standalone cause. Additionally, a concrete causal mechanism has not yet been established. A direct causal role will likely require confirmation through randomized controlled trials (RCTs) of antiviral or vaccine interventions.

=== Herpes Simplex ===
The best-studied candidate pathogen for this hypothesis is herpes simplex virus type 1 (HSV-1), which establishes latency in the trigeminal ganglion and has been detected by PCR in the brains of both AD patients and age-matched controls. The viral concept of AD proposes that latent HSV-1 in the brains of carriers of the ε4 allele of APOE undergoes episodic reactivation triggered by inflammation or immunosuppression, producing cumulative neuronal damage, amyloid-β (Aβ) deposition, and tau protein hyperphosphorylation, which are all classic hallmarks of AD. In cell culture and mouse models, HSV-1 infection upregulates BACE1 and alters amyloid precursor protein processing, producing intracellular accumulation of Aβ and hyperphosphorylated tau. It has also been found that antiviral drugs such as acyclovir reduce levels of HSV-1-induced Aβ accumulation by 70% and inhibit abnormal tau phosphorylation.

=== Herpes Zoster ===
Epidemiological data also provide evidence for this hypothesis. A 2025 study used the age-based eligibility cutoff of the Welsh herpes zoster vaccination program as a natural experiment and reported that receipt of the live-attenuated zoster vaccine reduced the probability of a new dementia diagnosis over seven years by approximately 20%. Nationwide cohort studies from Taiwan have also found that antiherpetic treatment following symptomatic HSV or varicella-zoster virus infection is associated with a reduced subsequent incidence of dementia.

== Research use ==
Neurotropic viruses are increasingly being exploited as research tools, and for their potential use in treatment. In particular, they are being used to improve the understanding of the nervous systems circuits.

== Other neurotropic infections ==
Several diseases, including transmissible spongiform encephalopathy, kuru, and Creutzfeldt–Jakob disease resemble a slow neurotropic virus infection—but are, in fact, caused by the infectious proteins known as prions.

== See also ==
- Blood–brain barrier
- Immunology
- Pathogen
- Virulent
