= Roseola =

Human disease caused by human herpesviruses

- Other names: Exanthema subitum, roseola infantum, sixth disease, baby measles, rose rash of infants, three-day fever
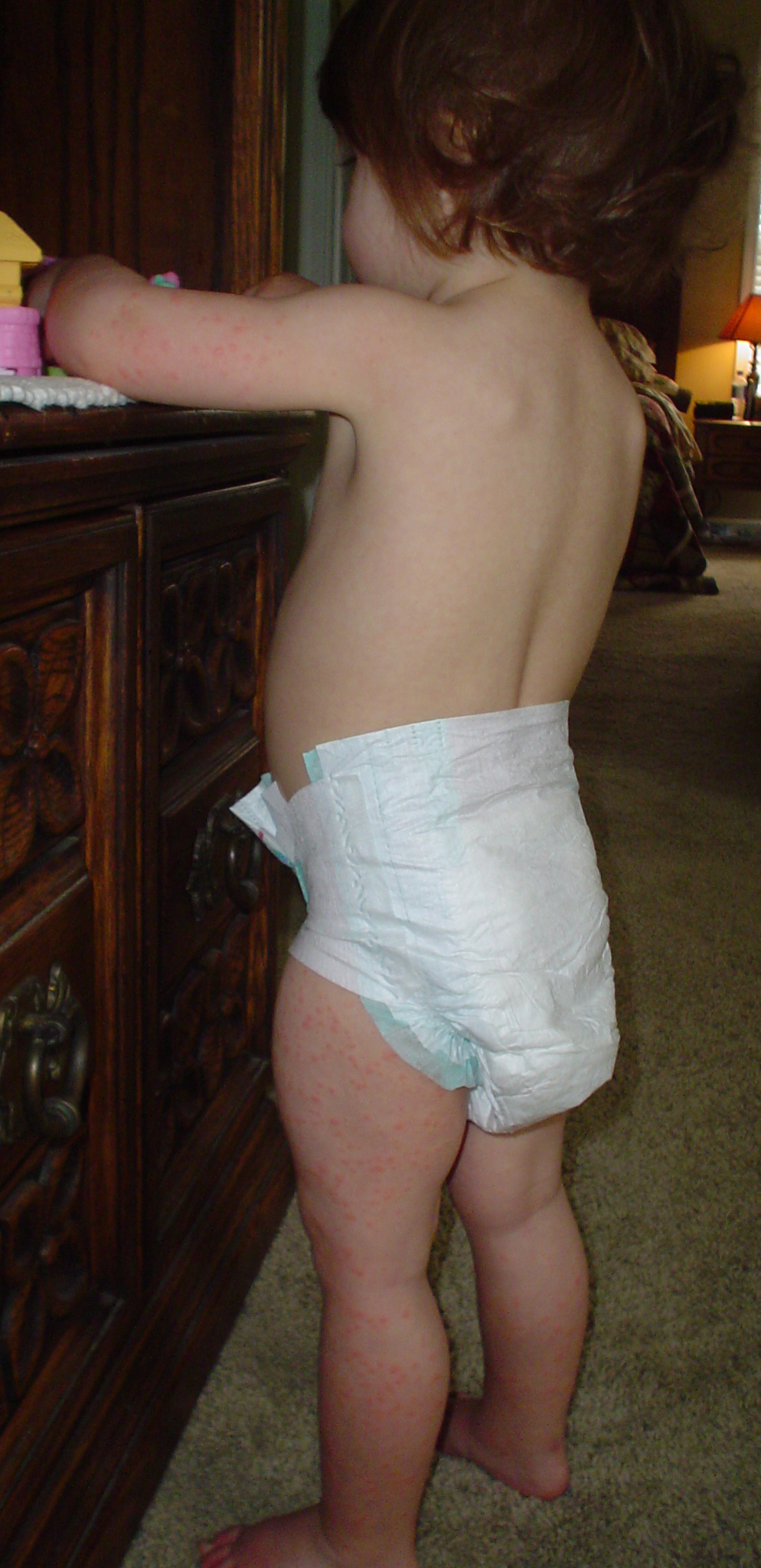
- Roseola rash on the arms and legs of a 21-month-old girl
- Specialty: Infectious disease
- Symptoms: Fever followed by rash
- Complications: Febrile seizures
- Usual onset: Before the age of 3, usually somewhere at age 2
- Duration: Few days
- Causes: Human herpesvirus 6 (HHV-6) or human herpesvirus 7 (HHV-7)
- Diagnostic method: Typically based on symptoms
- Differential diagnosis: Measles, rubella, scarlet fever
- Treatment: Supportive care
- Prognosis: Generally good

Roseola, also known as sixth disease, is an infectious disease caused by certain types of human herpes viruses. Most infections occur before the age of three. Symptoms vary from absent to the classic presentation of a fever of rapid onset followed by a rash. The fever generally lasts for three to five days, while the rash is generally pink and lasts for less than three days. Complications may include febrile seizures, with serious complications being rare.

It is caused by human herpesvirus 6 (HHV-6A, HHV-6B) or human herpesvirus 7 (HHV-7). Spread is usually through the saliva of those who are otherwise healthy. However, it may also spread from the mother to the baby during pregnancy. Diagnosis is typically based on symptoms and does not need to be confirmed with blood tests (PCR or antigen). Low numbers of white blood cells may also be present.

Treatment includes sufficient fluids and medications to treat the fever. Nearly all people are infected at some point. Males and females are affected equally often. The disease may reactivate in those with a weakened immune system and may result in significant health problems.

The disease was first described in 1910 while the causal virus was isolated in 1988. The name "sixth disease" comes from its place on the standard list of rash-causing childhood diseases, which also includes measles (first), scarlet fever (second), rubella (third), Dukes' disease (fourth, but is no longer widely accepted as distinct from scarlet fever), and erythema infectiosum (fifth).

== Signs and symptoms ==
=== Fever ===
Symptoms begin with a three to six-day febrile illness. During this time, temperatures can peak above 40 °C (104 °F) and children can experience increased irritability with general malaise. Many children in the febrile phase feel well, engaged, and alert. For these patients, fever is usually diagnosed incidentally.

The most common complication (10-15% of children between 6 and 18 months) and most common cause of hospitalization in children with primary infection of HHV-6B is febrile seizures which can precipitate status epilepticus due to the sudden rise in body temperature.

=== Rash ===
Once the febrile phase subsides, a rash develops. The rash sometimes presents one or two days after the fever resolves. The rash is classically described as an erythematous morbilliform exanthem and presents as a distribution of soft pink, discrete, and slightly raised lesions each with a 2-5mm diameter. It classically begins on the trunk (torso) and spreads outward to the neck, extremities, and face. This pattern is referred to as a centrifugal spread. Usually, peeling and itching are not characteristic of this rash. This phase can last anywhere from several hours to 2 days.

=== Other symptoms ===
A small percentage of children acquire HHV-6 with few signs or symptoms of the disease. Children with HHV-6 infection can also present with myringitis (inflammation of the tympanic membranes), upper respiratory symptoms, diarrhea, and a bulging fontanelle. In addition, children can experience pharyngitis with lymphoid hyperplasia seen on the soft palate and swelling of the eyelids. These symptoms usually present during the febrile phase of roseola. Cervical and postoccipital lymphadenopathy can also be seen, but this generally presents 2–4 days after the onset of the febrile phase.

In rare cases, HHV-6 can become active in an adult previously infected during childhood and can show signs of mononucleosis.

== Cause ==
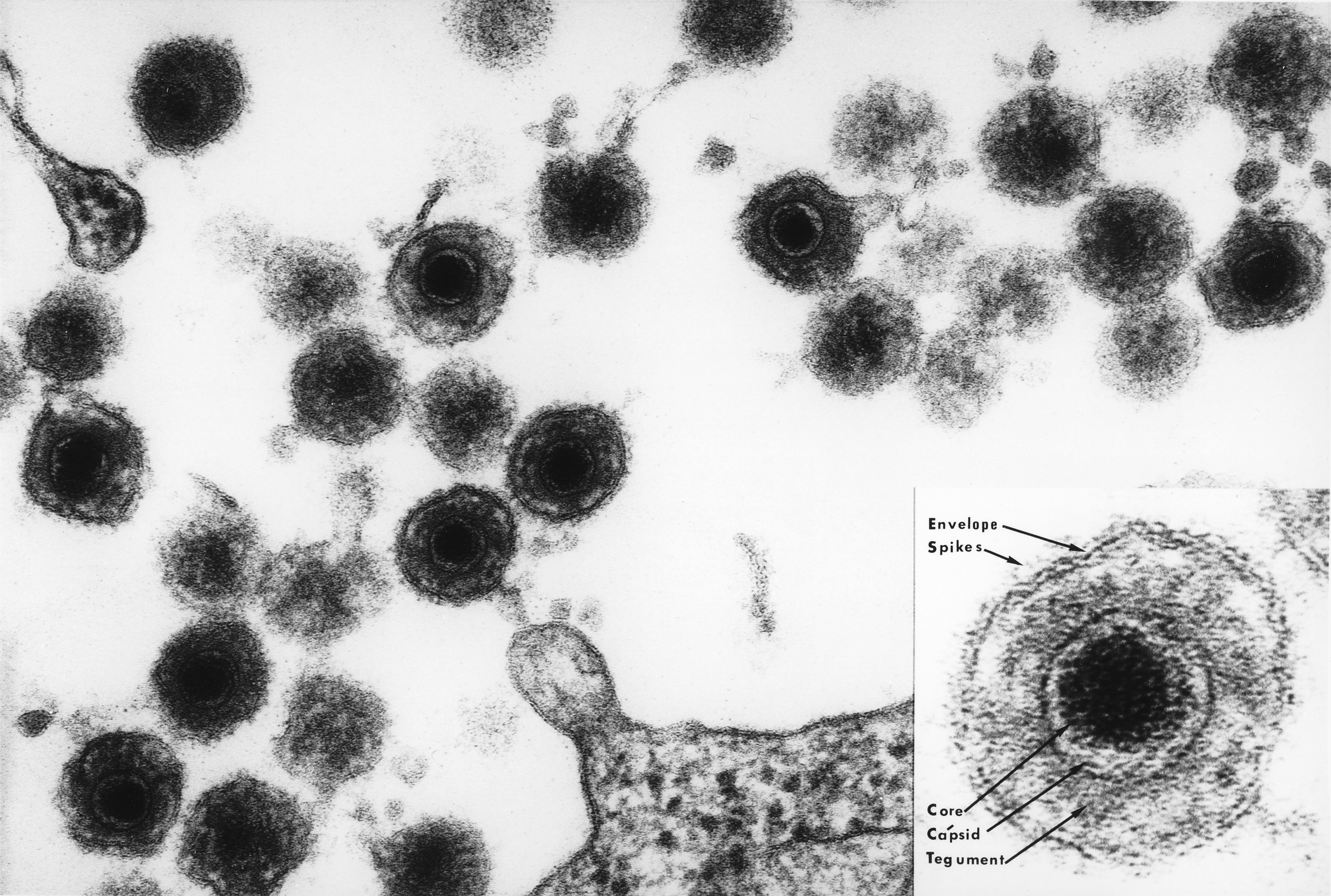
Electron micrograph of HHV-6

There are nine known human herpesviruses. Of these, roseola has been linked to two: human herpesvirus 6 (HHV-6) and human herpesvirus 7 (HHV-7), which are sometimes referred to collectively as Roseolovirus. These viruses are of the Herpesviridae family and the Betaherpesvirinae subfamily, under which Cytomegalovirus is also classified. HHV-6 has been further classified into HHV-6A and HHV-6B, two distinct viruses that share 88% of the same DNA makeup, with HHV-6B the most common cause of roseola.

After infection, these viruses enter a latent phase. Roseola caused by HHV-7 has been linked to the ability of HHV-7 infection to reactivate latent HHV-6.

=== Spread ===
After exposure to roseola, the causative virus becomes latent in its host but is still present in saliva, skin, and lungs. HHV-6 is thought to be transmitted from previously exposed or infected adults to young children by shedding the virus through saliva. Even so, most cases of roseola are transmitted without known exposure.

== Diagnosis ==
The diagnosis of roseola is made clinically based on the presence of the two phases: fever and rash. Laboratory testing is seldom used as the results do not alter the management of the disease. An exception is in people who are immunocompromised in whom serologic tests with viral identification can be used to confirm the diagnosis.

Roseola should be differentiated based on symptoms from other similar-appearing illnesses, such as rubella, measles, fifth disease, scarlet fever, and drug reactions.

== Prevention ==
Many viruses can cause roseola and are shed by carriers without symptoms. Because of this and the fact that most children with the disease are not seriously ill, there is no particular method of prevention. Proper hygienic measures, like regular handwashing, can be implemented as a routine prevention method. Those exposed or infected have been shown to shed the virus for the rest of their lives. No current guidelines exist regarding children staying home or away from child care when infected.

== Treatment ==
Most cases of HHV-6 infection improve on their own. Because of this, supportive care is the mainstay treatment.

The febrile phase can be managed using acetaminophen to control fever and prevent spikes in temperature which can lead to febrile seizures. In the case of febrile seizures, medical advice should be sought, and treatment aggressively pursued. Antiepileptic drugs are not recommended for patients who develop seizures from roseola.

Once children have entered the rash phase, reassurance is important as this indicates the resolution of the infection.

If encephalitis occurs in immunocompromised children, ganciclovir or foscarnet have inconsistently shown usefulness in treatment. Treatment of children who are immunocompromised centers around decreasing their levels of immunosuppression as much as possible.

== Prognosis ==
Children infected with roseola generally have a good prognosis. Most recover without intervention or long-term effects.

== Epidemiology ==
Between the two human herpesvirus 6 types, HHV-6B has been detected much more frequently in hosts. HHV-6B has been shown to affect about 90% of children before the age of 3. Out of these, 20% develop symptoms of roseola, also known as exanthem subitum.

Roseola affects girls and boys equally worldwide year-round. Roseola typically affects children between six months and two years of age, with peak prevalence in children between 7 and 13 months old. This correlates with the decrease in maternal antibodies, thus virus protection, that occurs at the age of 6 months. Out of all emergency department visits for children between ages 6 months and 12 months who have a fever, twenty percent of these are due to HHV-6.

Many children exposed and infected can present without symptoms, which makes determining the incidence within the population difficult.

== History ==
John Zahorsky MD wrote extensively on this disease in the early 20th century, his first formal presentation was to the St Louis Pediatric Society in 1909 where he described 15 young children with the illness. In a JAMA article published on Oct 18, 1913, he noted that "the name 'Roseola infantilis' had an important place in the medical terminology of writers on skin diseases" but that descriptions of the disease by previous writers tended to confuse it with many other diseases that produce febrile rashes. In this JAMA article, Zahorsky reports on 29 more children with roseola and notes that the only condition that should seriously be considered in the differential diagnosis is German measles (rubella) but notes that the fever of rubella only lasts a few hours whereas the prodromal fever of roseola lasts three to five days and disappears with the formation of a morbilliform rash.

== Names ==
Country	Local name (language)	Translated name
Belgium	Driedagenkoorts (Dutch); Zesde ziekte (Dutch); Roséole (French)	"three-day fever" "sixth disease" -
China (PRC)	急疹 (Mandarin) jí zhěn (pinyin)	"fast rash"
Czech republic	Šestá nemoc (Czech)	"sixth disease"
Denmark	Tredagesfeber (Danish)	"three-day fever"
Estonia	Roseool, kolme päeva palavik	Roseola/three day fever
Finland	Vauvarokko (Finnish)	"baby measles"
France	Roséole	"Roseola"
Germany	Drei-Tage-Fieber (German)	"Three-day fever"
Greece	Αιφνίδιο εξάνθημα (Greek)	"sudden rash"
Hungary	Háromnapos láz (Hungarian); Hatodik betegség (Hungarian)	"three-day fever" "sixth disease"
Iceland	Mislingabróðir (Icelandic)	"measles' brother"
Israel	Adamdemet, אדמדמת, אביבית (Hebrew)	"rose/pink rash"
Italy	Sesta malattia (Italian)	"sixth disease"
Japan	突発性発疹 (Japanese) toppatsuseihosshin	"fast/sudden rash"
Korea (South)	돌발진 (Korean) Dolbaljin	"fast/sudden rash"
Malaysia	Campak halus (Malay)	"small/tiny measles"
Netherlands	Zesde ziekte (Dutch)	"sixth disease"
Norway	Fjerde barnesykdom (Norwegian)	"fourth disease"
Philippines	Tigdas Hangin (Tagalog)	"wind measles"
Poland	Gorączka trzydniowa (Polish)	"Three-day fever"
Romanian	Roseola eruptia subita	Roseola
Russia	Розеола (Russian) шестая болезнь (Russian)	Roseola "sixth disease"
Singapore	Jiǎ má 假麻 (Chinese)	"false measles"
Slovakia	Šiesta (detská) choroba (Slovak)	"sixth disease"
Slovenia	Šesta bolezen (Slovenian)	"sixth disease"
South Africa	Roseola (English)	"Roseola"
Sweden	Tredagarsfeber; Sjätte sjukan (Swedish)	"three-day fever" Sixth disease
Taiwan	Méiguī zhěn 玫瑰疹 (Chinese)	"rose rash"
Turkey	Altıncı hastalık (Turkish)	"sixth disease"
Vietnam	Sốt phát ban (Vietnamese)	"baby rash"

== Research ==
HHV-6 has been tentatively linked with neurodegenerative diseases.

== See also ==
- Fifth disease
