= Macaca nemestrina herpesvirus 7 =

Virus classification
- (unranked): Virus
- Realm: Duplodnaviria
- Kingdom: Heunggongvirae
- Phylum: Peploviricota
- Class: Herviviricetes
- Order: Herpesvirales
- Family: Orthoherpesviridae
- Genus: Roseolovirus
- Species: Roseolovirus macacinebeta9

Synonyms
- Macaca nemestrina herpesvirus 7; Macacine betaherpesvirus 9

Species of virus

Macaca nemestrina herpesvirus 7 is a species of virus in the family Orthoherpesviridae.
