= Porcine cytomegalovirus =

Virus classification
- (unranked): Virus
- Realm: Duplodnaviria
- Kingdom: Heunggongvirae
- Phylum: Peploviricota
- Class: Herviviricetes
- Order: Herpesvirales
- Family: Orthoherpesviridae
- Genus: Roseolovirus
- Species: Roseolovirus suidbeta2

Synonyms
- Suid betaherpesvirus 2; Suid herpesvirus 2; SuHV-2; Porcine cytomegalovirus

Species of virus

Porcine cytomegalovirus is a virus of the family Orthoherpesviridae. It causes a viral disease that is infectious to pigs.

== Pathology ==
The disease is known as Inclusion body rhinitis (IBR), or cytomegalic inclusion disease It is not zoonotic, but the risk to humans that receive pig organ transplants is currently under investigation. It is a notifiable disease that is found worldwide. It is spread both vertically and horizontally and prevalence is high.

=== Clinical signs ===
Clinical signs are normally only seen in either piglets less than 3 weeks old or pregnant sows.

Signs in piglets include rhinitis, pneumonia, anaemia, fever and sudden death. Black discoloration around the eyes is often seen and gastrointestinal and neurological signs are also reported.

Signs in pregnant sows include reproductive failure, genital ulceration and agalactia.

=== Diagnosis ===
A presumptive diagnosis can be made based on the history and clinical signs. Definitive diagnosis is achieved by direct or indirect fluorescent-antibody testing (FAT), PCR, post mortem (signs include petechia and pulmonary congestion), histopathology or electron microscopy.

=== Treatment and control ===
Often no treatment is required. However, as Porcine cytomegalovirus is a member of Orthoherpesviridae family, it remains latent and sheds at times of stress. Therefore, husbandry measures to minimise stress levels should be in place.
