= Quwivirus =

Virus classification
- (unranked): Virus
- Realm: Duplodnaviria
- Kingdom: Heunggongvirae
- Phylum: Peploviricota
- Class: Herviviricetes
- Order: Herpesvirales
- Family: Orthoherpesviridae
- Subfamily: Betaherpesvirinae
- Genus: Quwivirus

Species
- See text

Genus of viruses

Quwivirus is a genus of viruses in the subfamily Betaherpesvirinae, in the family Orthoherpesviridae, in the order Herpesvirales.

== Species ==
The genus contains the following species, listed by scientific name and followed by the common name of the species

- Quwivirus caviidbeta2, Guinea pig cytomegalovirus
- Quwivirus miniopteridbeta1, Miniopterus schreibersii herpesvirus
- Quwivirus tupaiidbeta1, Tupaia herpesvirus
