= Proboscivirus =

Virus classification
- (unranked): Virus
- Realm: Duplodnaviria
- Kingdom: Heunggongvirae
- Phylum: Peploviricota
- Class: Herviviricetes
- Order: Herpesvirales
- Family: Orthoherpesviridae
- Subfamily: Betaherpesvirinae
- Genus: Proboscivirus

Species
- See text

Genus of viruses that affect elephants

Proboscivirus is a genus of viruses in the order Herpesvirales, in the family Orthoherpesviridae, in the subfamily Betaherpesvirinae. Elephants serve as natural hosts. EEHV1 causes asymptomatic infection in African elephants but causes fatal haemorrhagic disease in Asian elephants. The name "Proboscivirus" comes from the Greek word προβοσκίς or "proboscis" meaning "the elephant trunk," for which the virus accordingly uses as a means of contraction and transmission (secretions or openings of the trunk) to enter the elephant's body.

== Taxonomy ==
Proboscivirus is located under the listings of the ICTV Updates as Section §2005.049-050V.04. With the creation of Proboscivirus as a new genus came the creation and categorization of a new species under this genus, by the name of Elephant endotheliotropic herpesvirus 1. under ICTV §2005.051-050V.04.

It was suggested by Pellett (2014) that the phylogenetic divergence of Proboscivirus from other genera in the subfamily Betaherpesvirinae warrants reassignment of the genus to a new subfamily that would be called Deltaherpesvirinae. However, the genus remains in the Betaherpesvirinae in currently accepted ICTV taxonomy.

=== Species ===
The genus consists of the following species, listed by scientific name and followed by the common name of the species:

- Proboscivirus elephantidbeta1, Elephant endotheliotropic herpesvirus 1
- Proboscivirus elephantidbeta3, Elephant endotheliotropic herpesvirus 3A
- Proboscivirus elephantidbeta4, Elephant endotheliotropic herpesvirus 4
- Proboscivirus elephantidbeta5, Elephant endotheliotropic herpesvirus 5

== Structure ==
Viruses in Proboscivirus are enveloped, with icosahedral, spherical to pleomorphic, and round geometries, and T=16 symmetry. The diameter is around 150-200 nm. Genomes are linear and non-segmented.

Considering Proboscivirus is a herpesvirus, it is then unique in the sense that morphologically the virus is atypical to other viruses. According to University of Glasgow Immunology & Virology Professor, A.J. Davison, and his research team, the Proboscivirus morphology is a "linear, double-stranded DNA genome of 125-290 kbp contained within a T=16 icosahedral capsid, which is surrounded by [a] proteinaceous [mixture] and lipid envelope containing membrane-associated proteins". Species under the genus Proboscivirus tend to leave physical symptoms of cyanosis of the tongue, mouth/stomach ulcers, oedema of the head (or trunk for Elephants) on its host - often leading to death afterwards.

Genus	Structure	Symmetry	Capsid	Genomic arrangement	Genomic segmentation
Proboscivirus	Spherical Pleomorphic	T=16	Enveloped	Linear	Monopartite

== Life cycle ==
Viral replication is nuclear, and is lysogenic. Entry into the host cell is achieved by attachment of the viral glycoproteins to host receptors, which mediates endocytosis. Replication follows the dsDNA bidirectional replication model. DNA-templated transcription, with some alternative splicing mechanism is the method of transcription. The virus exits the host cell by nuclear egress, and budding. Elephants serve as the natural host.

Genus	Host details	Tissue tropism	Entry details	Release details	Replication site	Assembly site	Transmission
Proboscivirus	Elephants	None	Glycoprotiens	Budding	Nucleus	Nucleus	Contact
