= Human herpesvirus 7 =

Species of virus

- Specialty: Infectious disease

Human herpesvirus 7

Virus classification
- (unranked): Virus
- Realm: Duplodnaviria
- Kingdom: Heunggongvirae
- Phylum: Peploviricota
- Class: Herviviricetes
- Order: Herpesvirales
- Family: Orthoherpesviridae
- Genus: Roseolovirus
- Species: Roseolovirus humanbeta7

Synonyms
- Human betaherpesvirus 7; Human herpesvirus 7

Human herpesvirus 7 (HHV-7) is one of nine known members of the Herpesviridae family that infects humans. HHV-7 is a member of Betaherpesvirinae, a subfamily of the Herpesviridae that also includes HHV-6 and Cytomegalovirus (HHV-5 or HCMV). HHV-7 often acts together with HHV-6, and the viruses together are sometimes referred to by their genus, Roseolovirus. HHV-7 was first isolated in 1990 from CD4+ T cells taken from peripheral blood lymphocytes.

== Signs and symptoms ==
Both HHV-6B and HHV-7, as well as other viruses, can cause a skin condition in infants known as exanthema subitum, although HHV-7 causes the disease less frequently than HHV-6B. HHV-7 infection also leads to or is associated with a number of other symptoms, including acute febrile respiratory disease, fever, rash, vomiting, diarrhea, low lymphocyte counts, and febrile seizures, though most often no symptoms present at all.

There are indications that HHV-7 can contribute to the development of drug-induced hypersensitivity syndrome (DIHS), encephalopathy, hemiconvulsion-hemiplegia-epilepsy syndrome, hepatitis infection, postinfectious myeloradiculoneuropathy, pityriasis rosea, and the reactivation of HHV-4, leading to "mononucleosis-like illness". Drug reaction with eosinophilia and systemic symptoms (DRESS) is a specific type of DIHS that may be linked to HHV-7 as the condition may develop in response to herpesvirus antigens. In one study, 76% of the 40 examined patients with DRESS exhibited some reactivation of Epstein-Barr virus, HHV-6, or HHV-7. Additionally, HHV-7 is currently suspected as a causative agent of lichen planus. In one dermatologic study, 33 skin biopsies were performed and HHV-7 was found at higher rates in lichen planus lesions. Remission of lichen planus was also associated with lower levels of HHV-7. HHV-7 was also detected in 79.3% of cervical tissue examined, indicating that sexual contact may be a route of transmission for HHV-7.

Notably, HHV-7 and HHV-6 were detected in 56.3% of unspecified encephalopathy cases examined, with more HHV-7 positive cells in the gray matter of the frontal and temporal lobes HHV-7 is typically present in astrocytes and oligodendrocytes in the cerebral cortex, deep nuclei, and cerebellum. HHV-7 infection, along with HSV1, VZV, and HHV6, was associated with increased risk of dementia. However, further research is needed further elucidate the causative and correlative factors between HHV-7 and encephalopathy.

Complications with HHV-7 infection has been shown to be a factor in a great variety of transplant types. Specifically, HHV-7 infection has been linked to a reactivation of cytomegalovirus (CMV) infection in renal transplant patients and may be linked to graft-vs-host disease.

== Virology ==
=== Structure ===
A mature virus particle measures about 170 nanometres (1,700 Å) in diameter.

The genome of HHV-7 is very similar to that of HHV-6, although it is about 10% smaller, with a DNA genome of about 145,000 base pairs. There are a number of key differences between the genome of HHV-7 and that of HHV-6, but the importance of them for viral DNA replication is not yet known.

Additionally, the HHV-7 virion appears to share much structural similarity to the HHV-6 virion. Despite this, some morphological characteristics of the viruses differ.

=== Cellular effects ===
HHV-7 resides mostly in CD4+ T cells, albeit only in certain strains of them. To enter CD4+ T cells, HHV-7, unlike HHV-6, uses CD4 and possibly some cell-surface glycoproteins to enter CD4+ T cells. Despite this, HHV-7 may be able to enter cells that do not express the CD46 receptor. About a week after HHV-7 has infected a cell, it begins to downregulate CD4 transcription, which interferes with HIV-1 infection but may reactivate HHV-6 infection. It is however unclear exactly what effect HHV-7 has on HIV infection.

There has been some inquiry into the relationship between HHV-7 and HIV-1 co-receptors CXCR4 and CCR5. During infection, HHV-7 causes a loss of CXCR4 in CD4+ T-cells in addition to lowering intracellular Ca2+ flux and chemotaxis in response to stroll cell-derived factor 1 (SDF-1). Additionally, a CXCR4 antagonist that was effective against HIV was shown to be ineffective at inhibiting HHV-7. This information indicates that CXCR4 and CCR5 are not essential receptor proteins for HHV-7 infection.

The trademark indication of HHV-7 infection at the cellular level is the presence of aforementioned syncytia. It is thought that these cells form via polyploidization resulting from a dysregulation of cyclin dependent kinase cdc2 and cyclin B. Giant cells form when the cell cycle is disrupted and accumulate between the G_{2} and M phase. However, syncytia formation is more complex than initially thought. Some research has shown that syncytia formation in betaherpesviruses can vary based on the type of envelop protein expressed by the virion as well as the particular type of cell that the virus is infecting.

HHV-7 also notably activates IL-15 upon infection. Activation of IL-15 leads to an increased natural killer (NK) cell response. This is thought to be one of the immune system's main methods of responding to HHV-7 infection.

HHV-7 also has a number of other effects on cells. Among these include membrane leaking, the presence of lytic syncytia, occasional apoptosis, the supporting of latent infection, and increases and decreases in levels of certain cytokines.

=== Entry ===
HHV-7, like many other herpesviruses, relies on glycoproteins for entry. Specifically, HHV-7 is known to encode glycoproteins B, H, and L, but not C or D. In terms of betaherpesviruses specifically, it is thought that gB, gH, and gL are required for infection. Additionally, HHV-7 encodes a glycoprotein complex (gp82-105) that is unique to HHV-7 and HHV-6.

== Detection and treatment ==
In adults, the effects of HHV-7 separate from HHV-6 have not been well-researched. One reason for this is because the detection of HHV-7 was at first difficult to do quickly, as the process for doing so involves a procedure that is difficult to do in commercial laboratories and because viral isolation and serological testing are long processes that do not lend themselves to finishing quickly. HHV-7 can be grown in various lymphocytes in vitro, but researchers have noted that the virus does not propagate well under laboratory conditions. A process known as loop-mediated isothermal amplification (LAMP) has recently been applied to speed up detection of HHV-7, although a larger sample size of patients must be tested first to see if the test will still work across a broad range of subjects. No reliable serological test has been developed yet for HHV-7 alone, but multiple are in the process of being developed. The use of PCR assays to test for HHV-7 is also being explored.

No HHV-7 infection-specific treatment exists. While HHV-7 may not be linked to any specific diseases, some researchers emphasize that the virus is still clinically relevant as it causes significant complications in immunocompromised patients. Specific treatment options for HHV-6, 7, and 8 are currently in the early stages of development. Some research suggests that acyclovir and anti-CMV drugs such as cidofovir and foscarnet may have some therapeutic benefit in HHV-7 infection. Additionally, some experimental drugs, such as cyclotriazadisulfonamide, and 9-R-2-phosphonomethoxypropyladenine may be effective against HHV-7. There is a need for HHV-7 specific treatments, however, because broad-spectrum antivirals are typically toxic and thus unsuitable for prophylactic use.

== Epidemiology ==
Over 95% of adults have been infected and are immune to HHV-7, and over three quarters of those were infected before the age of six. Primary infection of HHV-7 among children generally occurs between the ages of 2 and 5, which means it occurs after primary infection of HHV-6. A 2014 Washington University School of Medicine's analysis of 102 healthy adults sampled at as many as five major body habitats found that HHV-7 was present in 98% of them, especially in the mouth. A 2017 study looking at the human blood virome in 8,240 humans between the ages of 2 months to 102 years found that 20.37% of them were positive for HHV-7.
