= Muromegalovirus =

Virus classification
- (unranked): Virus
- Realm: Duplodnaviria
- Kingdom: Heunggongvirae
- Phylum: Peploviricota
- Class: Herviviricetes
- Order: Herpesvirales
- Family: Orthoherpesviridae
- Subfamily: Betaherpesvirinae
- Genus: Muromegalovirus

Species
- See text

Genus of viruses

Muromegalovirus is a genus of viruses in the order Herpesvirales, in the family Orthoherpesviridae, in the subfamily Betaherpesvirinae. Rodents serve as natural hosts. There are three species in this genus. Diseases associated with this genus include: infected peritoneal macrophages, dendritic cells (DC) and hepatocytes, inducing significant pathology in both the spleen and the liver. Murid viruses Murine cytomegalovirus and Murid herpesvirus 2 (MuHV-2) belong to this genus.

== Species ==
The genus contains the following species, listed by scientific name and followed by the common name of the species:

- Muromegalovirus muridbeta1, Murine cytomegalovirus
- Muromegalovirus muridbeta2, Murid herpesvirus 2
- Muromegalovirus muridbeta8, Murid herpesvirus 8

== Structure ==
Viruses in Muromegalovirus are enveloped, with icosahedral, spherical to pleomorphic, and round geometries, and T=16 symmetry. The diameter is around 150-200 nm. Genomes are linear and non-segmented, around 230kb in length.

| Genus | Structure | Symmetry | Capsid | Genomic arrangement | Genomic segmentation |
|---|---|---|---|---|---|
| Muromegalovirus | Spherical pleomorphic | T=16 | Enveloped | Linear | Monopartite |

== Life cycle ==
Viral replication is nuclear, and is lysogenic. Entry into the host cell is achieved by attachment of the viral glycoproteins to host receptors, which mediates endocytosis. Replication follows the dsDNA bidirectional replication model. DNA-templated transcription, with some alternative splicing mechanism is the method of transcription. The virus exits the host cell by nuclear egress, and budding. Rodents serve as the natural host.

| Genus | Host details | Tissue tropism | Entry details | Release details | Replication site | Assembly site | Transmission |
|---|---|---|---|---|---|---|---|
| Muromegalovirus | Rodents | Salivary glands | Glycoprotiens | Budding | Nucleus | Nucleus | Contact |
