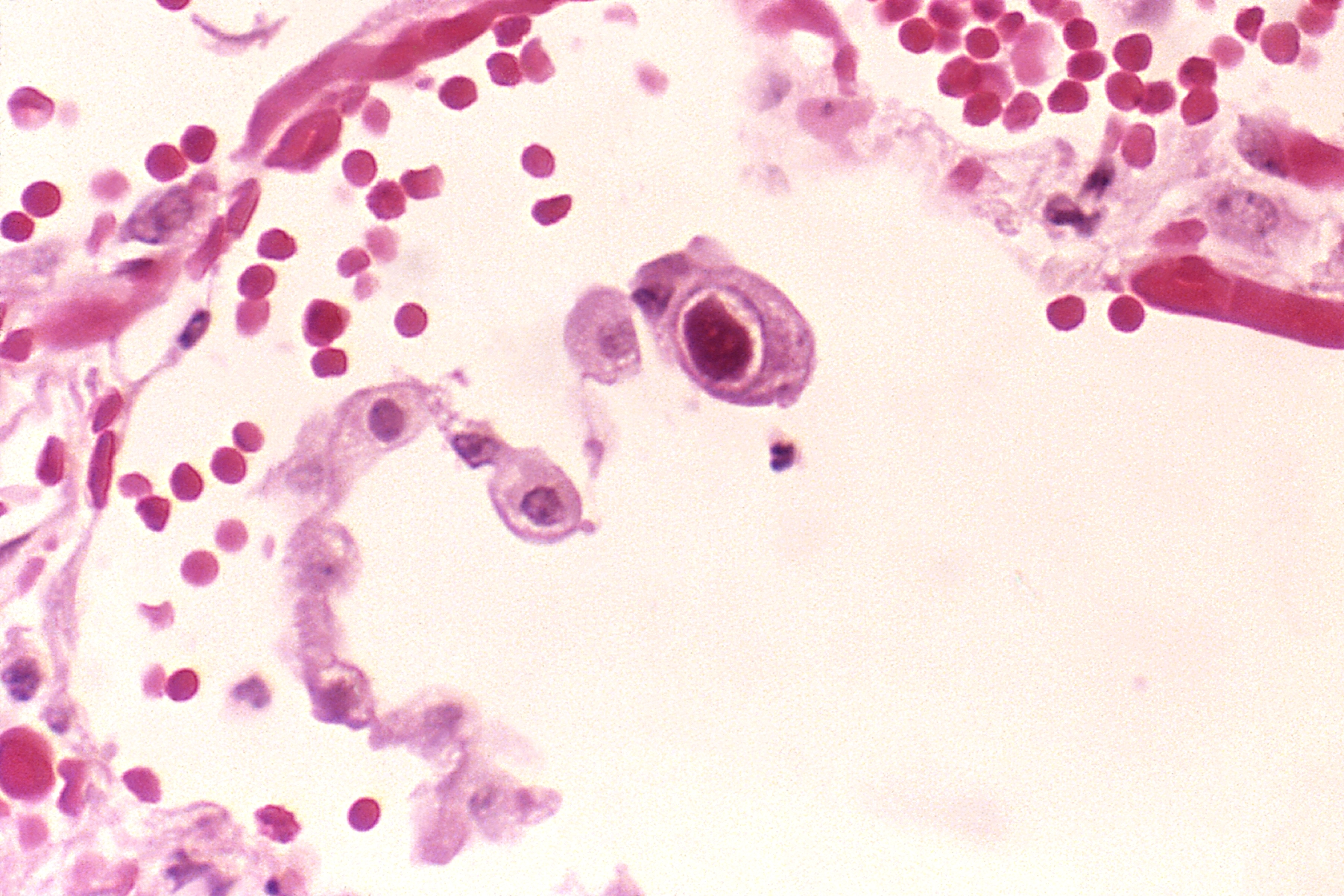
- Typical "owl eye" intranuclear inclusion indicating CMV infection of a lung pneumocyte

Virus classification
- (unranked): Virus
- Realm: Duplodnaviria
- Kingdom: Heunggongvirae
- Phylum: Peploviricota
- Class: Herviviricetes
- Order: Herpesvirales
- Family: Orthoherpesviridae
- Subfamily: Betaherpesvirinae
- Genus: Cytomegalovirus

Species
- See text

Synonyms
- Human cytomegalovirus group

= Cytomegalovirus =

Genus of viruses

Cytomegalovirus (CMV) (from cyto- 'cell' via Greek κύτος kútos- 'container' + μέγας mégas 'big, megalo-' + -virus via Latin vīrus 'poison') is a genus of viruses in the order Herpesvirales, in the family Orthoherpesviridae, in the subfamily Betaherpesvirinae. Humans and other primates serve as natural hosts. The 11 species in this genus include Human cytomegalovirus (HCMV, HHV-5), which is the species that infects humans. Diseases associated with HHV-5 include mononucleosis and pneumonia, and congenital CMV in infants can lead to variety of birth defects, including those involving the eyes, ears, liver, and spleen.

In the medical literature, most mentions of CMV without further specification refer implicitly to human CMV. Human CMV is the most studied of all cytomegaloviruses.

MX2/MXB protein was identified as a restriction factor for herpesviruses, which acts at a very early stage of the replication cycle and MX2/MXB restriction of herpesvirus requires GTPase activity.

== Taxonomy ==
Within the family Orthoherpesviridae, CMV belongs to the Betaherpesvirinae subfamily, which also includes the genera Muromegalovirus and Roseolovirus (human herpesvirus 6 and human herpesvirus 7). It is also related to other herpesviruses within the Alphaherpesvirinae subfamily, which includes herpes simplex viruses 1 and 2 and varicella-zoster virus, and the Gammaherpesvirinae subfamily, which includes Epstein–Barr virus and Kaposi's sarcoma-associated herpesvirus.

Several species of Cytomegalovirus have been identified and classified for different mammals. The most studied is Human cytomegalovirus (HCMV), which is also known as Human herpesvirus 5 (HHV-5). Other primate CMV species include Chimpanzee cytomegalovirus (CCMV) that infects chimpanzees and orangutans, and Simian cytomegalovirus (SCCMV) and Rhesus cytomegalovirus (RhCMV) that infect macaques; CCMV is known as both Panine herpesvirus 2 (PaHV-2) and Pongine betaherpesvirus 4 (PoHV-4). SCCMV is called Cercopithecine herpesvirus 5 (CeHV-5) and RhCMV, Cercopithecine herpesvirus 8 (CeHV-8). A further two viruses found in the night monkey are tentatively placed in the genus Cytomegalovirus, and are called Herpesvirus aotus 1 and Herpesvirus aotus 3. Rodents also have viruses previously called cytomegaloviruses that are now reclassified under the genus Muromegalovirus; this genus contains Mouse cytomegalovirus (MCMV) is also known as Murid herpesvirus 1 (MuHV-1) and the closely related Murid herpesvirus 2 (MuHV-2) that is found in rats.

=== Species ===
The genus contains the following species, listed by scientific name and followed by the common name of the species:

- Cytomegalovirus aotinebeta1, Aotine herpesvirus 1
- Cytomegalovirus cebinebeta1, Cebine herpesvirus 1
- Cytomegalovirus cercopithecinebeta5, Cercopithecine herpesvirus 5
- Cytomegalovirus humanbeta5, Human cytomegalovirus
- Cytomegalovirus macacinebeta3, Rhesus cytomegalovirus
- Cytomegalovirus macacinebeta8, Cynomolgus macaque cytomegalovirus
- Cytomegalovirus mandrillinebeta1, Drill monkey cytomegalovirus
- Cytomegalovirus paninebeta2, Chimpanzee cytomegalovirus
- Cytomegalovirus papiinebeta3, Papiine herpesvirus 3
- Cytomegalovirus papiinebeta4, Chacma baboon cytomegalovirus
- Cytomegalovirus saimiriinebeta4, Squirrel monkey cytomegalovirus

== Structure ==
Schematic of a Cytomegalovirus

Viruses in Cytomegalovirus are enveloped, with icosahedral, spherical to pleomorphic, and round geometries, and T=16 symmetry. The diameter is around 150–200 nm. Genomes are linear and nonsegmented, around 200 kb in length.

Genus	Structure	Symmetry	Capsid	Genomic arrangement	Genomic segmentation
Cytomegalovirus	Spherical pleomorphic	T=16	Enveloped	Linear	Monopartite

== Genome ==
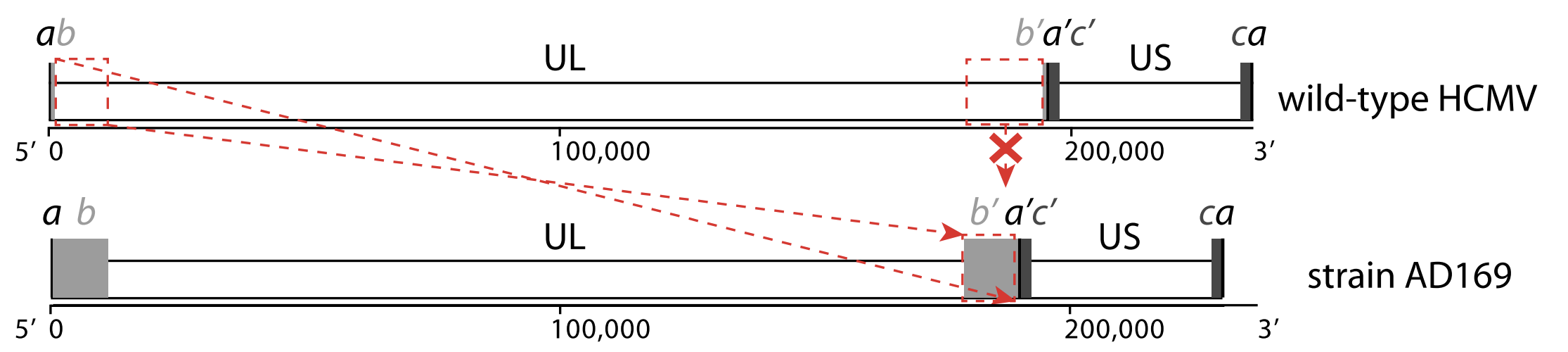
Class E genome of HCMV. The unique long and unique short regions are indicated as UL and US. Repeat regions are indicated as a, b and c sequences, where primes designate inverted orientations. Sequences ab and b′a′ correspond to the terminal/internal repeat long (TRL/IRL); sequences a′c′ and ca correspond to the internal/terminal repeat short (IRS/TRS). Top: typical genome arrangement of wild-type strains; bottom: genome arrangement of strain AD169, a laboratory-adapted strain. Genome rearrangements that have occurred during extensive passaging are indicated in red between the wild-type and laboratory-adapted configurations.

Herpesviruses have some of the largest genomes among human viruses, often encoding hundreds of proteins. For instance, the double‑stranded DNA (dsDNA) genome of wild-type HCMV strains has a size of around 235 kb and encodes at least 208 proteins. It is thus longer than all other human herpesviruses and one of the longest genomes of all human viruses in general. It has the characteristic herpesvirus class E genome architecture, consisting of two unique regions (unique long UL and unique short US), both flanked by a pair of inverted repeats (terminal/internal repeat long TRL/IRL and internal/terminal repeat short IRS/TRS). Both sets of repeats share a region of a few hundred bps, the so-called "a sequence"; the other regions of the repeats are sometimes referred to as "b sequence" and "c sequence".

== Life cycle ==
Viral replication is nuclear and lysogenic. Entry into the host cell is achieved by attachment of the viral glycoproteins to host receptors, which mediates endocytosis. Replication follows the dsDNA bidirectional replication model. DNA templated transcription, with some alternative splicing mechanism is the method of transcription. Translation takes place by leaky scanning. The virus exits the host cell by nuclear egress and budding. Humans and monkeys serve as the natural hosts. Transmission routes are dependent on coming into contact with bodily fluids (such as saliva, urine, and genital secretions) from an infected individual.

Genus	Host details	Tissue tropism	Entry details	Release details	Replication site	Assembly site	Transmission
Cytomegalovirus	humans; monkeys	Epithelial mucosa	Glycoproteins	Budding	Nucleus	Nucleus	Urine; saliva; congenital

All herpesviruses share a characteristic ability to remain latent within the body over long periods. Although they may be found throughout the body, CMV infections are frequently associated with the salivary glands in humans and other mammals.

== Genetic engineering ==
The CMV promoter is commonly included in vectors used in genetic engineering work conducted in mammalian cells, as it is a strong promoter and drives constitutive expression of genes under its control.

== History ==
Cytomegalovirus was first observed by German pathologist Hugo Ribbert in 1881 when he noticed enlarged cells with enlarged nuclei present in the cells of an infant. Years later, between 1956 and 1957, Thomas Huckle Weller together with Smith and Rowe independently isolated the virus, known thereafter as "cytomegalovirus". In 1990, the first draft of human cytomegalovirus genome was published, the biggest contiguous genome sequenced at that time.

== See also ==
- CMV polyradiculomyelopathy
