= Roseolovirus =

Virus classification
- (unranked): Virus
- Realm: Duplodnaviria
- Kingdom: Heunggongvirae
- Phylum: Peploviricota
- Class: Herviviricetes
- Order: Herpesvirales
- Family: Orthoherpesviridae
- Subfamily: Betaherpesvirinae
- Genus: Roseolovirus

Species
- See text

Genus of viruses

Roseolovirus is a genus of viruses in the order Herpesvirales, in the family Orthoherpesviridae, in the subfamily Betaherpesvirinae. There are six species in this genus. Diseases associated with this genus include: HHV-6: sixth disease (roseola infantum, exanthema subitum); HHV-7: symptoms analog to the 'sixth disease'.

== Species ==
The genus contains the following species, listed by scientific name and followed by the common name of the species:

- Roseolovirus humanbeta7, Human herpesvirus 7
- Roseolovirus humanbeta6a, Human herpesvirus 6A
- Roseolovirus humanbeta6b, Human herpesvirus 6B
- Roseolovirus macacinebeta9, Macaca nemestrina herpesvirus 7
- Roseolovirus muridbeta3, Mouse thymic virus
- Roseolovirus suidbeta2, Porcine cytomegalovirus

== Structure ==
Viruses in Roseolovirus are enveloped, with icosahedral, spherical to pleomorphic, and round geometries, and T=16 symmetry. The diameter is around 150-200 nm. Genomes are linear and non-segmented, around 200kb in length.

Genus	Structure	Symmetry	Capsid	Genomic arrangement	Genomic segmentation
Roseolovirus	Spherical pleomorphic	T=16	Enveloped	Linear	Monopartite

== Life cycle ==
Viral replication is nuclear, and is lysogenic. Entry into the host cell is achieved by attachment of the viral glycoproteins to host receptors, which mediates endocytosis. Replication follows the dsDNA bidirectional replication model. DNA-templated transcription, with some alternative splicing mechanism, is the method of transcription. The virus exits the host cell by nuclear egress, and budding. Humans serve as the natural host. Transmission routes are direct contact and respiratory.

Genus	Host details	Tissue tropism	Entry details	Release details	Replication site	Assembly site	Transmission
Roseolovirus	Humans	T-cells; B-cells; NK-cell; monocytes; macrophages; epithelial	Glycoprotiens	Budding	Nucleus	Nucleus	Respiratory contact

== Diseases ==
Human herpesvirus 6 (HHV-6) is a set of two closely related herpes viruses known as HHV-6A and HHV-6B that infect nearly all human beings, typically before the age of two. The acquisition of HHV-6 in infancy is often symptomatic, resulting in childhood fever, diarrhea, and exanthem subitum rash (commonly known as roseola). Although rare, this initial infection can also cause febrile seizures, encephalitis or intractable seizures.

Like the other herpesviruses (Epstein–Barr virus, Human herpesvirus 3, etc.), HHV-6 establishes lifelong latency and can become reactivated later in life. This reactivation has been associated with many clinical manifestations. Reactivation can occur in locations throughout the body, including the brain, lungs, heart, kidney and gastrointestinal tract. In some cases, HHV-6 reactivation in the brain tissue can cause cognitive dysfunction, permanent disability and death.

A growing number of studies also suggest that HHV-6 may play a role in a subset of patients with chronic neurological conditions such as multiple sclerosis, mesial temporal lobe epilepsy, status epilepticus and chronic fatigue syndrome.
