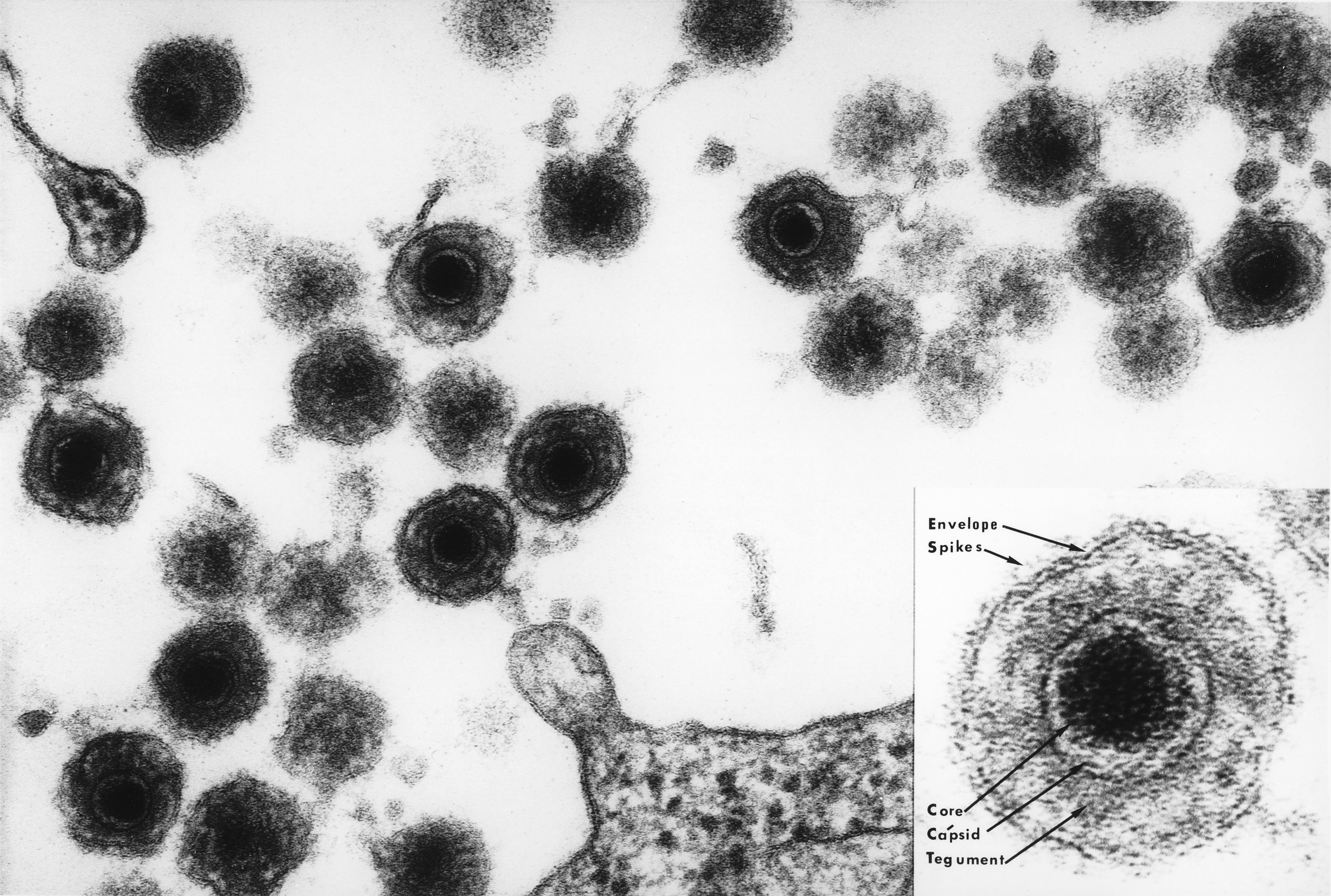
- Electron micrograph of one of the HHV6 species
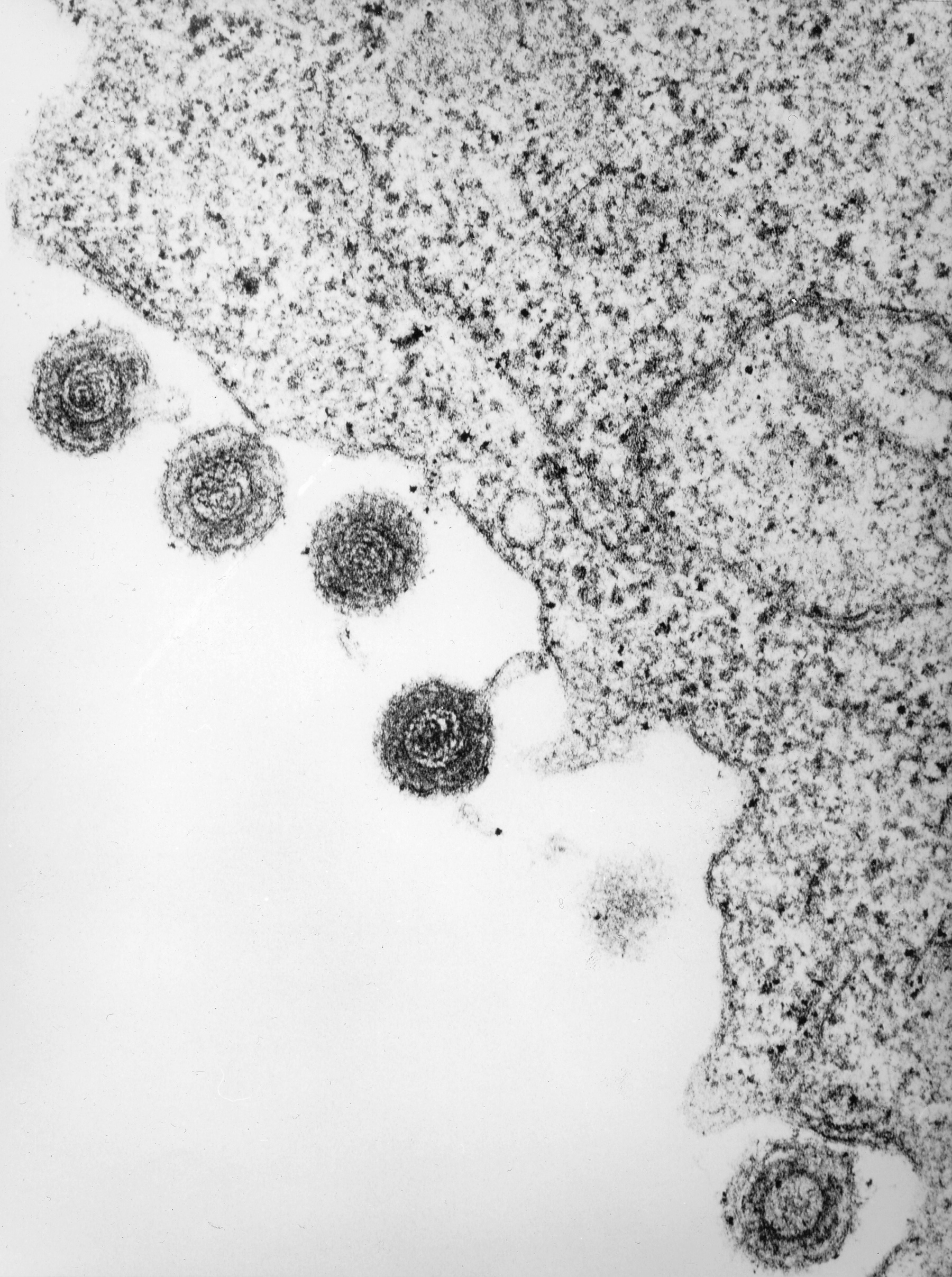
- HHV-6 released from a lymphocyte which has been infected

Scientific classification
- (unranked): Virus
- Realm: Duplodnaviria
- Kingdom: Heunggongvirae
- Phylum: Peploviricota
- Class: Herviviricetes
- Order: Herpesvirales
- Family: Orthoherpesviridae
- Subfamily: Betaherpesvirinae
- Genus: Roseolovirus

Groups included
- Roseolovirus humanbeta6a (Human herpesvirus 6A); Roseolovirus humanbeta6b (Human herpesvirus 6B)

Cladistically included but traditionally excluded taxa
- All other Roseolovirus species

= Human herpesvirus 6 =

Informal grouping of viruses

Human herpesvirus 6 (HHV-6) is the common collective name for human herpesvirus 6A (HHV-6A) and human herpesvirus 6B (HHV-6B). These closely related viruses are two of the nine known herpesviruses that have humans as their primary host.

HHV-6A and HHV-6B are double-stranded DNA viruses within the Betaherpesvirinae subfamily and of the genus Roseolovirus. HHV-6A and HHV-6B infect almost all of the human populations that have been tested.

HHV-6A has been described as more neurovirulent, and as such is more frequently found in patients with neuroinflammatory diseases such as multiple sclerosis. HHV-6 (and HHV-7) levels in the brain are also elevated in people with Alzheimer's disease.

HHV-6B primary infection is the cause of the common childhood illness exanthema subitum (also known as roseola infantum or sixth disease). It is passed on from child to child. It is uncommon for adults to contract this disease as most people have had it by kindergarten, and once contracted, immunity arises and prevents future reinfection. Additionally, HHV-6B reactivation is common in transplant recipients, which can cause several clinical manifestations such as encephalitis, bone marrow suppression, and pneumonitis.

A variety of tests are used in the detection of HHV-6, some of which do not differentiate the two species.

Both viruses can cause transplacental infection and be passed on to a newborn.

== HHV-6A and Infertility ==
A 2016 study showed that 43% of women with unexplained infertility tested positive for HHV-6A compared to 0% in the fertile control group. HHV-6A was found present in endometrial epithelial cells from women with unexplained infertility but not in their blood. In the context of infertility, this discovery underscores the importance of targeted testing for HHV-6A within the uterine environment, as the virus was not detected in the bloodstream of the affected individuals. Effective diagnosis, therefore, requires tests that are capable of distinguishing between active and latent HHV-6A infections specifically in endometrial tissue, highlighting the need for tissue-specific viral detection methods in assessing and managing infertility associated with HHV-6A.

A 2018 study found 37% of women experiencing recurrent implantation failure after IVF/ET had HHV-6A in their endometrial biopsies, compared to 0% in control groups.

A 2019 study confirmed the presence of HHV-6A infection in 40% of idiopathic infertile women. Identifying the effect of HHV-6A infection on endometrial immune status opens up a new perspectives on fertility care. It is possible to choose antiviral therapies and non-hormonal approaches for women with unexplained infertility characterized by HHV-6A to increase their pregnancy rate.

== Testing for HHV-6 ==
The table below presents a comprehensive overview of various diagnostic tests used to detect human herpesvirus 6 (HHV-6), detailing their ability to distinguish between active and latent infections. It also includes insights on the interpretation of test results, identifies providers that offer these tests, and indicates which methods are suitable for detecting HHV-6A in the endometrial lining—an important consideration for evaluating potential causes of infertility in women. The table serves as a guide for healthcare professionals to select appropriate diagnostic tests for HHV-6.

Diagnostic Tests for HHV-6 Infection and Their Utility in Uterine Environment Analysis
Examination	Active vs. Latent Infection Detection	Insights	Providers	Uterine Detection for Infertility
Covee™ (menstruating women only)	Yes, it checks endometrial cells which are shed monthly.	Only at-home sample collection option.Uses small amount (1-2ml) of menstrual fluid.	Fertility Phoenix	Yes
IgG Assessment via ELISA	No, it only indicates prior exposure to the virus.	A high ELISA score (>5) could suggest an active infection; however, only IFA-based tests can precisely quantify the antibody levels.	Various laboratories offer ELISA testing.	No
IgG Analysis by IFA	Yes, significantly raised levels compared to healthy norms suggest recent or ongoing infection.	A low total IgG due to immune deficiency won't show increased titer levels. A singular rise in HHV-6 antibody levels may hint at an infection.	Quest Diagnostics and ARUP Laboratories are known to provide IFA testing with specific median titer ranges.	No
IgM Screening	Yes, present only during or shortly after active infection.	Lack of IgM doesn't exclude the possibility of active infection, as chronic infections may not show IgM presence.	IgM tests are widely available.	No
PCR for HHV-6 in Fluids	Yes, presence in fluids suggests an acute infection.	Negative results for HHV-6 DNA don't exclude tissue-based persistent infections. Repeat testing and whole blood analysis are recommended for thorough evaluation.	PCR testing is a common service offered by many laboratories.	No
Whole Blood PCR (Viral Load Count)	Yes, viral load above a certain threshold indicates active infection.	In healthy individuals, viral loads are usually below the detection limit of standard labs.	PCR viral load testing is standard in many diagnostic labs.	No
Whole Blood PCR (Presence/Absence)	No, cannot distinguish between active and latent states.	The majority of healthy individuals will have latent HHV-6B. This test helps identify the type of HHV-6 but not its activity.	Not specified in the original table.	No
Immunohistochemical Testing	Yes, can detect virus replication through protein expression.	Can discern between HHV-6A and HHV-6B activity in fixed tissue.	Coppe Laboratories	Yes
Tissue PCR (Qualitative)	No, does not indicate if the virus is currently active.	Tissue typing is possible; specimens should be promptly frozen for transport.	ViracorIBT is mentioned as offering qualitative PCR testing on tissue samples.	No
Tissue PCR (Quantitative)	Yes, discriminates between dormant low-level presence and active high-level infections.	Requires a specific amount of tissue for analysis and different labs may have varying material requirements.	Coppe Laboratories and Eurofins-Viracor are noted as providers, with Eurofins requiring 5 mg and Coppe 1 mg of material.	Yes
ddPCR for ciHHV-6 Status	No, designed to confirm ciHHV-6 presence, not active infection.	Recommended when ciHHV-6 infection is suspected by healthcare providers.	This test was introduced by the University of Washington for identifying ciHHV-6.	No
ciHHV-6 Status Testing using PCR of Hair follicle or finger nail	No, designed to confirm ciHHV-6 presence, not active infection.	The Gold standard for determining ciHHV6	Coppe Laboratories	No

== History ==
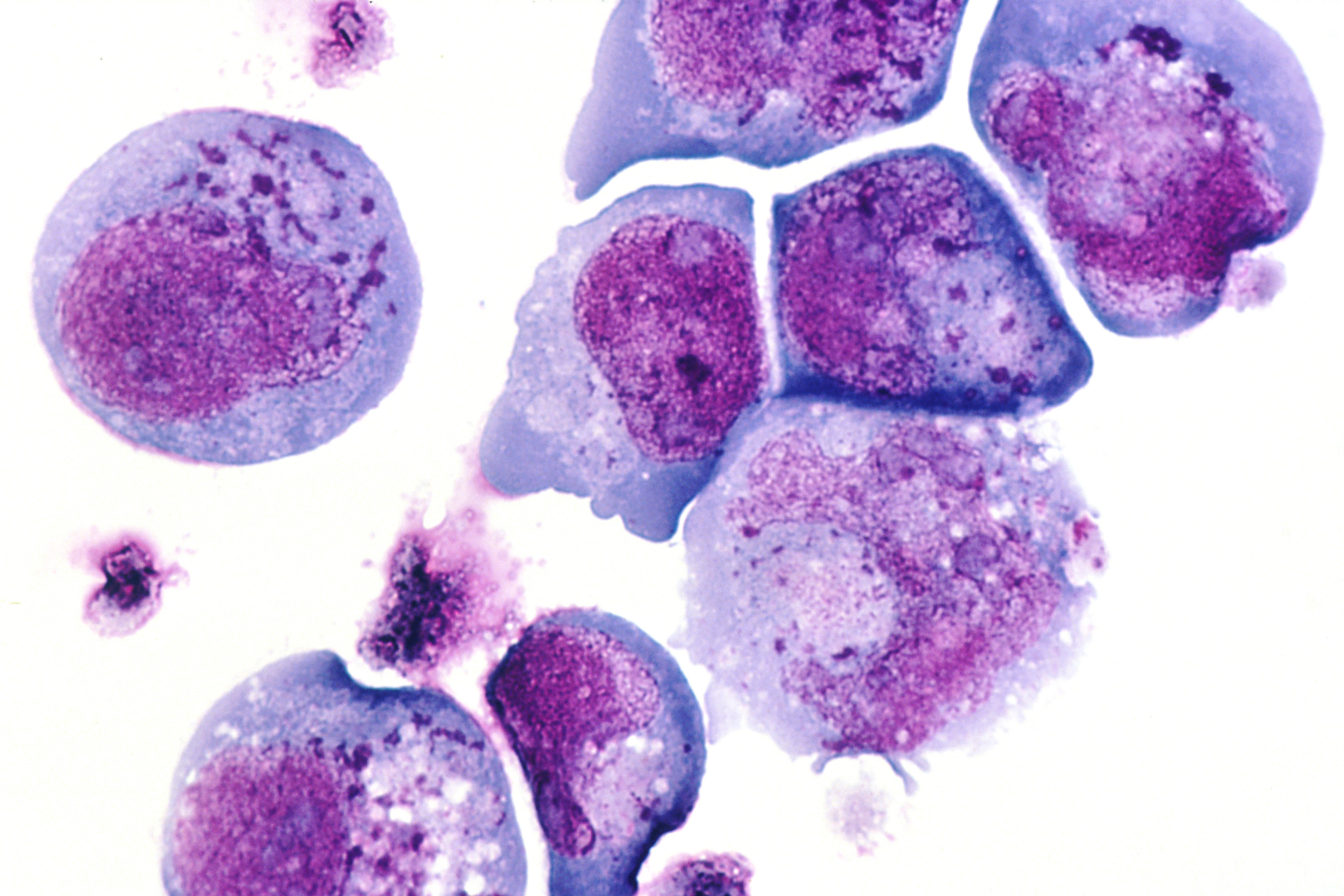
Histological slide of the human herpes virus-6 showing infected cells, with inclusion bodies in both the nucleus and the cytoplasm.

During 1986, Syed Zaki Salahuddin, Dharam Ablashi, and Robert Gallo cultivated peripheral blood mononuclear cells from patients with AIDS and lymphoproliferative illnesses. Short-lived, large, refractile cells that frequently contained intranuclear and/or intracytoplasmic inclusion bodies were documented. Electron microscopy revealed a novel virus that they named human B-lymphotropic virus (HBLV).

Shortly after its discovery, Ablashi et al. described five cell lines that can be infected by the newly discovered HBLV. They published that HSB-2, a particular T-cell line, is highly susceptible to infection. Ablashi's pioneering research concluded by suggesting that the virus name be changed from HBLV to HHV-6, in accord with the published provisional classification of herpes viruses.

Years later, HHV-6 was divided into subtypes. Early research (1992) described two very similar, yet unique variants: HHV-6A and HHV-6B. The distinction was warranted due to unique restriction endonuclease cleavages, monoclonal antibody reactions, and growth patterns.

HHV-6A includes several adult-derived strains and its disease spectrum is not well defined, although it is thought by some to be more neurovirulent. HHV-6B is commonly detected in children with roseola infantum, as it is the etiologic agent for this condition. Within these two viruses is a sequence homology of 95%.

In 2012, HHV-6A and HHV-6B were officially recognized as distinct species.

== Taxonomy ==
HHV-6A and HHV-6B were recognized by the International Committee on Taxonomy of Viruses (ICTV) as distinct species in 2012. Human roseoloviruses include HHV-6A, HHV-6B and HHV-7.

Herpesvirus was established as a genus in 1971 in the first report of the ICTV. This genus consisted of 23 viruses among 4 groups. In 1976, a second ICTV report was released in which this genus was elevated to the family level — the herpetoviridae. Because of possible confusion with viruses derived from reptiles, the family name was changed in the third report (1979) to herpesviridae. In this report, the family Herpesviridae was divided into 3 subfamilies (alphaherpesvirinae, betaherpesvirinae and gammaherpesvirinae) and 5 unnamed genera; 21 viruses were recognized as members of the family.

In 2009, the order Herpesvirales was created. This was necessitated by the discovery that the herpes viruses of fish and molluscs are only distantly related to those of birds and mammals. Order Herpesvirales contains three families, the Herpesviridae, which contains the long-recognized herpesviruses of mammals, birds, and reptiles, plus two new families — the family Alloherpesviridae which incorporates herpes viruses of bony fish and frogs, and the family Malacoherpesviridae which contains viruses of molluscs.

As of 2012, this order currently has 3 families, 4 subfamilies (1 unassigned), 18 genera (4 unassigned) and 97 species.

== Structure ==
The diameter of an HHV-6 virion is about 2000 angstroms. The virion's outer portion consists of a lipid bilayer membrane that contains viral glycoproteins and is derived from that of the host. Below this membrane envelope is a tegument which surrounds an icosahedral capsid, composed of 162 capsomeres. The protective capsid of HHV-6 contains double stranded linear DNA.

During maturation of HHV-6 virions, human cell membranes are used to form viral lipid envelopes (as is characteristic of all enveloped viruses). During this process HHV-6 utilizes lipid rafts, which are membranous microdomains enriched by cholesterol, sphingolipids, and glycosylphosphatidylinositol-anchored proteins. Early researchers suspected that HHV-6 virions mature in the nucleus; some even incorrectly published this, as they generalized and applied to HHV-6 what was known about other viruses. However, researched published in 2009 suggests that the HHV-6 virus utilizes trans-Golgi-network-derived vesicles for assembly.

== Genome ==
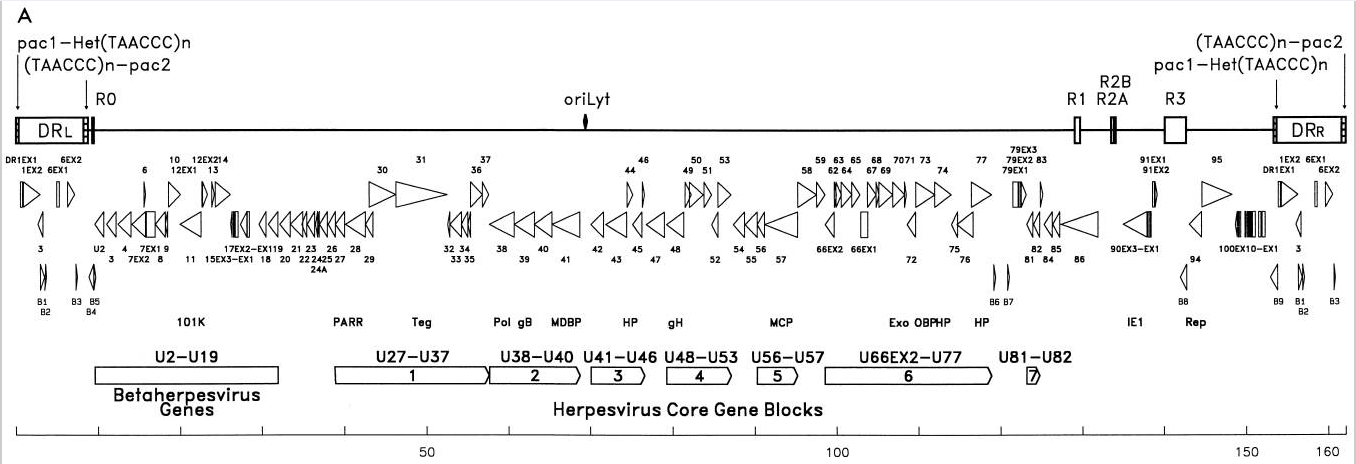
HHV-6B genome from Dominguez et al. 1999

The genetic material of HHV-6 is composed of linear (circular during an active infection), double stranded DNA which contains an origin of replication, two 8–10 kb left and right direct repeat termini, and a unique segment that is 143–145kb.

The origin of replication (often labeled as "oriLyt" in the literature) is where DNA replication begins. The direct repeat termini (DR_{L} and DR_{R}) possess a repeated TTAGGG sequence, identical to that of human telomeres. Variability in the number of telomeric repeats is observed in the range of 15–180. These termini also contain pac-1 and pac-2 cleavage and packing signals that are conserved among herpesviruses.

The unique segment contains seven major core gene blocks (U27–U37, U38–U40, U41–U46, U48–U53, U56–U57, U66EX2–U77, and U81–U82), which is also characteristic of herpesviruses. These conserved genes code for proteins that are involved in replication, cleavage, and packing of the viral genome into a mature virion. Additionally, they code for a number of immunomodulatory proteins. The unique segment also possesses a block of genes (U2–U19) that are conserved among HHV-6, HHV-7, and cytomegaloviruses (the betaherpesviruses). A number of the unique segment genes are associated with, for instance, the HCMV US22 family (InterPro: IPR003360). The table below outlines some of their known properties.

=== Genes ===
Gene	Stage	Properties
IE-A (IE1? U89?)	Immediate early	Part of IE locus — impairs interferon gene expression to restrict the development of cellular anti-viral measures, favoring a successful infection — not in membrane — activates viral DNA polymerases, involved in rolling circle replication — expression of this gene may be modulated by micro RNAs
IE-B	Immediate early	Part of IE locus Activates viral DNA polymerases, involved in rolling circle replication
DR1		HCMV US22 gene family
DR6		HCMV US22 gene family, transactivator, oncogene
DR7/U1		SR domain, malignant transforming activity, binds to p53
U2		HCMV US22 gene family — tegument protein
U3		HCMV UL24 homolog, HCMV US22 gene family, tegument protein — transactivating activity
U4		HCMV Maribavir resistance
U7		HCMV US22 gene family
U10		dUTPase family
U11		Strongly immunoreactive virion protein — antigenic tegument protein
U12		Chemokine G protein-coupled receptor
U13		CMV: Represses US3 transcription
U14		Binds and incorporates p53 into viral particles — HCMV UL25 gene family — antigenic tegument protein
U15		HCMV UL25 gene family
U17		HCMV UL25 gene family — tegument protein
U18	IE-B	Membrane glycoprotein
U19	IE-B protein	Glycoprotein
U20		Glycoprotein (specific to Roseolovirus) predicted immunoglobulin structure
U21		Binds to MHC-1 molecules and prevents antigen presenting cells from presenting HHV-6 peptides — glycoprotein, downregulates HLA I (specific to Roseolovirus)
U22	Late gene	Glycoprotein (absent from HHV-7, specific to Roseolovirus)
U23		Glycoprotein (specific to Roseolovirus)
U24		Inhibits proper T cell activation, reducing secretion of cytokines at infection site — phosphorylation target for kinases — glycoprotein M (gM) (specific to Roseolovirus)
U25		HCMV UL22 gene family, tegument protein
U26		Putative multiple transmembrane protein
U27		DNA polymerase processivity factory
U28		Ribonucleotide reductase large subunit, tegument protein
U29		Capsid assembly and DNA maturation
U30		Tegument protein
U31		Large tegument protein
U32		Capsid protein, hexon tips
U33		Virion protein
U34		Membrane-associated phosphoprotein, primary envelopment
U35		Terminase component, DNA packaging
U36		DNA packaging
U37		Tegument protein, primary envelopment, phosphoprotein
U38		DNA polymerase
U39 (gB, gp116)		Glycoprotein
U40		Transport, capsid assembly
U41	Early gene	Major DNA binding protein
U42		Tegument protein, cell cycle block, transactivator
U43		DNA Helicase-primase complex
U44		Tegument protein
U45		dUTPase
U46		Glycoprotein N, membrane protein
U47 (gO, O)		Glycoprotein O, associates with lipid rafts, exists in two forms, gO-120K and gO-80K, and gO-80K contains complex type N-linked oligosaccharides which are incorporated into viral particles
U48 (gH, gp100)		Glycoprotein gH, virion constituent, part of CD46 gQ1/gQ2/gL/gH ligand complex, associates with lipid rafts
U49		Virion-associated regulatory protein, fusion protein
U50		DNA packaging
U51	Early gene	G protein-coupled chemokine receptor, preventing expression greatly reduces replication — increases intracellular levels of second messenger inositol phosphate, promotes chemotaxis – early gene, along with U41 and U69
U52		
U53		Protease, capsid assembly protein
U54		Tegument protein, virion transactivator
U55		Role in RNA synthesis, dUTPase
U56		Capsid protein
U57		Major capsid protein
U58		
U59		Tegument protein
U61		
U62		
U63		
U64		DNA packaging: tegument protein
U65		Tegument protein
U66		Terminase component
U69	Early gene	Tegument protein kinase (Ganciclovir kinase) involved in replication
U70		Alkaline exonuclease
U71		Myristylated virion protein
U72 (gM)		Glycoprotein M
U73		Origin-binding protein
U74		DNa helicase-primase complex
U75		Tegument protein
U76		DNA packaging, virion protein
U77		Helicase-primase complex
U79		Transcriptional activation
U80		Predicted immunoglobulin structure
U81		Uracil-DNA glycosylase
U82 (gL, gp80)		Glycoprotein L, virion constituent, part of CD46 gQ1/gQ2/gL/gH ligand complex, associates with lipid rafts
U83		Secreted chemotactic (chemoattractant) glycoprotein, binds to chemokine receptors, recruits host cells that secrete chemokines specific to U51
U85		Glycoprotein (specific to Roseolovirus)
U86	IE-2	IE-2 transactivator
U88	IE-A	
U90	IE-A (IE 1)	Transactivator
U91		IE-A, Glycoprotein
U94	Latency (immediate early or early gene)	Involved in transcriptional repression of lytic genes – aids in the specific integration of HHV-6A/HHV-6B into the telomeres — highly expressed during latency — parvovirus rep homolog (absent in HHV-7)
U95		CMV US22 gene family – colocalizes and interacts with the mitochondrial GRIM-19 protein, an essential component of the oxidative phosphorylation system — binds to nuclear factor-kappa B (NF-κB), deregulation of which has been postulated to contribute to cancer
U100 (Gp82-105)	Late gene	Glycoprotein Q, virion constituent, associates with lipid rafts
gQ1		Glycoprotein, complexes with gH and gL to form viral ligand to CD46 receptor – modified by N-glycosylation — expressed in two different forms: an 80-kDa form (gQ1-80K) and a 74-kDa form (gQ1-74K) – only gQ1-80K, but not gQ1-74K, forms the CD46 ligand complex with gQ2, gH, and gL Associates with lipid rafts.
gM1		Lipid-raft-specific ganglioside, incorporated into virion
gQ2		Glycoprotein, forms gH/gL/gQ1/gQ2 complex, part of receptor ligand – essential for viral growth, associates with lipid rafts — exists in two forms: gQ2-34K and gQ2-37K
Micro RNAs		hhv6b-miR-Ro6-1, -Ro6-2, -Ro6-3, and -Ro6-4. May regulate early transcription
P100 aka p101		Immunogenic, constituent of tegument
ORF-1 (DR7)		Binds and inhibits transcriptional activity of p53 – can transform human epidermal keratinocytes and NIH 3T3 cells in vitro – cells expressing ORF-1 protein produce fibrosarcomas when injected into nude mice

== Viral entry ==
=== HHV-6 receptor ===
When an extracellular HHV-6 virion comes across human cells, it encounters the human receptor protein cluster of differentiation 46 (CD46), which plays a role in regulating the complement system. The CD46 protein possesses a single variable region, as a result of alternative splicing. As such, at least fourteen isoforms of CD46 exist, all of which bind HHV-6a.

The extracellular region of CD46 contains four short consensus repeats of about 60 amino acids that fold into a compact beta-barrel domain surrounded by flexible loops. As has been demonstrated for CD46 with other ligands, the CD46 protein structure linearizes upon binding HHV-6. While their precise interaction has not yet been determined, the second and third SCR domains have been demonstrated as required for HHV-6 receptor binding and cellular entry.

=== HHV-6 receptor ligand ===
Mori et al. first identified the gene product gQ1, a glycoprotein unique to HHV-6, and found that it forms a complex with gH and gL glycoproteins. They believed that this heterotrimer complex served as the viral ligand for CD46. Soon thereafter, another glycoprotein named gQ2 was identified and found to be part of the gH/gL/gQ1 ligand complex, forming a heterotetramer that was positively identified as the viral CD46 ligand. The exact process of entry is not yet well understood.

=== Salivary glands ===
The salivary glands have been described as an in vivo reservoir for HHV-6 infection.

=== Leukocytes ===
Researchers conducted a study to show that T cells are highly infectable by HHV-6.

=== Nervous system ===
During the year 2011, researchers at the National Institutes of Health attempted to elucidate the then unknown method whereby HHV-6a gains entry into the nervous system. As such, they autopsied the brains of around 150 subjects. When various anatomical regions were assayed for their viral load, olfactory tissues were found to have the highest HHV-6 content. They concluded that these tissues are the entry point for HHV-6a.

The results above are consistent with those of previous studies that involved HSV-1 (and a number of other viruses), which also disseminates into the CNS through olfactory tissue.

Researchers also hypothesized that olfactory ensheathing cells (OECs), a group of specialized glial cells found in the nasal cavity, may have a role in HHV-6 infectivity. They suspected this association as a result of OECs having properties similar to those of astrocytes, another type of glial cell that was previously identified as being susceptible to HHV-6 infection. Research continued by infecting OECs in vitro with both types of HHV-6. Ultimately, only OECs in which HHV-6a was used tested positive for signs of de novo viral synthesis, as is also characteristic of astrocytes.

== Cellular activity ==
Once inside, two outcomes have been described: active and inactive infections.

=== Active infection ===
Active infections involve the linear dsDNA genome circularizing by end to end covalent linkages. This process was first reported for the herpes simplex virus. Once circularized, HHV-6 begins to express what are known as "immediate early" genes. These gene products are believed to be transcription activators and may be regulated by the expression of viral micro RNAs. Subsequent expression of "early genes" then occurs and activates, for instance, viral DNA polymerases. Early genes are also involved in the rolling circle replication that follows.

HHV-6's replication results in the formation of concatemers, which are long molecules that contain several repeats of a DNA sequence. These long concatemers are then cleaved between the pac-1 and pac-2 regions for packaging of the genome into individual virions.

=== Inactive infection ===
Not all newly infected cells begin rolling circle replication. Herpesviruses may enter a latent stage, inactively infecting their human host. Since its discovery in 1993, this phenomenon has been found among all of the betaherpesviruses.

Other betaherpesviruses establish latency as a nuclear episome, which is a circular DNA molecule (analogous to plasmids). For HHV-6, latency is believed to occur exclusively through the integration of viral telomeric repeats into human subtelomeric regions. Only one other virus, Marek's disease virus, is known to achieve latency in this fashion. This phenomenon is possible as a result of the telomeric repeats found within the direct repeat termini of HHV-6's genome.

The right direct repeat terminus integrates within 5 to 41 human telomere repeats, and preferentially does so into the proximal end of chromosomes 9, 17, 18, 19, and 22, but has also occasionally been found in chromosomes 10 and 11. Nearly 70 million individuals are suspected to carry chromosomally integrated HHV-6.

A number of genes expressed by HHV-6 are unique to its inactive latency stage. These genes involve maintaining the genome and avoiding destruction of the host cell. For instance, the U94 protein is believed to repress genes that are involved in cellular lysis (apoptosis) and also may aid in telomeric integration. Once stored in human telomeres, the virus is reactivated intermittently.

=== Reactivation and transplantation ===
The specific triggers for reactivation are not well understood. Some researchers have suggested that injury, physical or emotional stress, and hormonal imbalances could be involved.

Researchers during 2011 discovered that reactivation can positively be triggered in vitro by histone deacetylase inhibitors. Once reactivation begins, the rolling circle process is initiated and concatemers are formed as described above.

A study published in The Journal of Infectious Diseases in 2024 investigated the reactivation of inherited chromosomally integrated human herpesvirus 6 (iciHHV-6B) in a liver transplant recipient and its impact on the graft. The research, conducted by Hannolainen et al., used hybrid capture sequencing and various molecular techniques to analyze the viral sequences and host immune response. The findings demonstrated active replication of iciHHV-6B and significant immune activation, suggesting the pathological impact of viral reactivation on transplant outcomes. The study emphasizes the importance of monitoring iciHHV-6 reactivation in transplant patients.

=== Interactions ===
Human herpesvirus 6 lives primarily on humans and, while variants of the virus can cause mild to fatal illnesses, can live commensally on its host. It has been demonstrated that HHV-6 fosters the progression of HIV-1 upon coinfection in T cells. HHV-6 upregulates the expression of the primary HIV receptor CD4, thus expanding the range of HIV susceptible cells. Several studies also have shown that HHV-6 infection increases production of inflammatory cytokines that enhance in vitro expression of HIV-1, such as TNF-alpha, IL-1 beta, and IL-8. A more recent in vivo study shows HHV-6A coinfection to dramatically accelerate the progression from HIV to AIDS in pigtailed macaques.

HHV-6 has also been demonstrated to transactivate Epstein–Barr virus.

== Epidemiology ==
=== Age ===
Humans acquire the virus at an early age, some as early as less than one month of age. HHV-6 primary infections account for up to 20% of infant emergency room visits for fever in the United States and are associated with several more severe complications, such as encephalitis, lymphadenopathy, myocarditis and myelosuppression. The prevalence of the virus in the body increases with age (rates of infection are highest among infant between 6 and 12 months old) and it is hypothesized that this is due to the loss of maternal antibodies in a child that protect him or her from infections.

There are inconsistencies with the correlations between age and seropositivity: According to some reports there is a decrease of seropositivity with the increase of age, while some indicate no significant decline, and others report an increased rate of seropositivity for individuals age 62 and older. After primary infection, latency is established in salivary glands, hematopoietic stem cells, and other cells, and exists for the lifetime of the host.

=== Geographical distribution ===
The virus is known to be widespread around the world. An HHV-6 infection rate of 64–83% by age 13 months has been reported for countries including the United States, United Kingdom, Japan and Taiwan. Studies have found seroprevalence varying "from approximately 39 to 80% among ethnically diverse adult populations from Tanzania, Malaysia, Thailand, and Brazil." There are no significant differences among ethnic groups living in the same geographical location or between sexes. While HHV-6B is present in almost all of the world's populations, HHV-6A appears to be less frequent in Japan, North America, and Europe.

=== Transmission ===
Transmission is believed to occur most frequently through the shedding of viral particles into saliva. Both HHV-6B and HHV-7 are found in human saliva, the former being at a lower frequency. Studies report varying rates of prevalence of HHV-6 in saliva (between 3–90%), and have also described the salivary glands as an in vivo reservoir for HHV-6. The virus infects the salivary glands, establishes latency, and periodically reactivates to spread infection to other hosts.

Vertical transmission has also been described, and occurs in approximately 1% of births in the United States. This form is easily identifiable as the viral genome is contained within every cell of an infected individual.

== Diagnosis ==
The diagnosis of HHV-6 infection is performed by both serologic and direct methods. The most prominent technique is the quantification of viral DNA in blood, other body fluids, and organs by means of real-time PCR.

== Clinical significance ==
The classical presentation of primary HHV-6b infection is as exanthema subitum (ES) or "roseola", featuring a high temperature lasting 3 to 5 days followed by a rash on the torso, neck, or face and sometimes febrile convulsions, however, the symptoms are not always present together. However, one study (1997) indicated that a rash is not a distinguishing feature of HHV-6 infection, with rates similar to non-HHV-6 infections (10–20% of febrile children in both groups). HHV-6 infections more frequently present with high temperatures (over 40C), at a rate of around two thirds compared to less than half in the non-HHV-6 patients. Similarly significant differences were seen in malaise, irritability, and tympanic membrane inflammation.

Primary infection in adults tend to be more severe.

Diagnosis for the virus, particularly HHV-6B, is vital for the patient because of the infection's adverse effects. Symptoms that point to this infection, such as rashes, go unnoticed in patients that receive antibiotics because they can be misinterpreted as a side-effect of the medicine. In addition to exanthema subitum HHV-6B is known to be associated with the hepatitis, febrile convulsions, and encephalitis.

The virus periodically re-activates from its latent state, with HHV-6 DNA being detectable in 20–25% of healthy adults in the United States. In the immunocompetent setting, these re-activations are often asymptomatic, but in immunosuppressed individuals there can be serious complications. HHV-6 re-activation causes severe disease in transplant recipients and can lead to graft rejection, often in consort with other betaherpesviruses. Likewise in HIV/AIDS, HHV-6 re-activations cause disseminated infections leading to end organ disease and death. Although up to 100% of the population are exposed (seropositive) to HHV-6, most by 3 years of age, there are rare cases of primary infections in adults. In the United States, these have been linked more with HHV-6a, which is thought to be more pathogenic and more neurotropic and has been linked to several central nervous system-related disorders.

HHV-6 has been reported in multiple sclerosis patients and has been implicated as a co-factor in several other diseases, including chronic fatigue syndrome, AIDS, and temporal lobe epilepsy.

=== Multiple sclerosis ===
Multiple sclerosis (MS) is an autoimmune and inflammatory disorder of the nervous system that results in demyelination of axons in the brain and spinal cord. The first study to specifically investigate HHV-6-related demyelination appeared in the literature during 1996, when a previously healthy 19-month-old child developed acute encephalopathy. Levels of myelin basic protein were elevated in his cerebrospinal fluid, suggesting that demyelination was occurring. This link was almost forgotten, until four years later when an MS-related study was published showing an HHV-6 prevalence of 90% among demyelinated brain tissues. In comparison, a mere 13% of disease-free brain tissues possessed the virus.

The molecular mimicry hypothesis, in which T cells confuse an HHV-6 viral protein with myelin basic protein, first appeared around this time. Early on in the development of this hypothesis (2002), Italian researchers used the HHV-6a variant along with bovine myelin basic protein to generate cross-reactive T cell lines. These were compared to the T cells of individuals with MS as well as those of controls, and no significant difference was found between the two. Their early research suggested that molecular mimicry may not be a mechanism that is involved in MS.

Several similar studies followed. A study from October 2014 supported the role of long-term HHV-6 infection with demyelination in progressive neurological diseases.

=== Myalgic encephalomyelitis/chronic fatigue syndrome ===
Myalgic encephalomyelitis/chronic fatigue syndrome (ME/CFS) is a debilitating illness, the cause of which is unknown. Patients with ME/CFS have abnormal neurological, immunological, and metabolic findings.

For many, but not all, patients who meet criteria for ME/CFS, the illness begins with an acute, infectious-like syndrome. Cases of ME/CFS can follow well-documented infections with several infectious agents. A study of 259 patients with a "CFS-like" illness published shortly after HHV-6 was discovered used primary lymphocyte cultures to identify people with active replication of HHV-6. Such active replication was found in 70% of the patients vs. 20% of the control subjects ($P < 10^{-8}$). The question raised but not answered by this study was whether the illness caused subtle immune deficiency that led to reactivation of HHV-6, or whether reactivation of HHV-6 led to the symptoms of the illness.

Subsequent studies employing only serological techniques that do not distinguish active from latent infection have produced mixed results: most, but not all, have found an association between ME/CFS and HHV-6 infection.

Other studies have employed assays that can detect active infection: primary cell culture, PCR of serum or plasma, or IgM early antigen antibody assays. The majority of these studies have shown an association between ME/CFS and active HHV-6 infection, although a few have not.

In summary, active infection with HHV-6 is present in a substantial fraction of patients with ME/CFS. Moreover, HHV-6 is known to infect cells of the nervous system and immune system, organ systems with demonstrable abnormalities in ME/CFS. Despite this association, it remains unproven that reactivated HHV-6 infection is a cause of ME/CFS.

=== Hashimoto's thyroiditis ===
Hashimoto's thyroiditis is the most common thyroid disease and is characterized by abundant lymphocyte infiltrate and thyroid impairment. Recent research suggests a potential role for HHV-6 (possibly variant A) in the development or triggering of Hashimoto's thyroiditis.

=== Pregnancy ===
The role of HHV-6 during pregnancy leading to inflammation in the amniotic cavity has been studied.

=== Infertility ===
HHV-6A DNA was found in the endometrium of almost half of a group of infertile women, but in none of the fertile control group. Natural killer cells specific for HHV-6A, and high uterine levels of certain cytokines, were also found in the endometrium of the infertile women positive for HHV-6A. The authors suggest that HHV-6A may prove to be an important factor in female infertility.

=== Cancer ===
Many human oncogenic viruses have been identified. For instance, HHV-8 is linked to Kaposi's sarcoma, the Epstein–Barr virus to Burkitt's lymphoma, and HPV to cervical cancer. In fact, the World Health Organization estimated (2002) that 17.8% of human cancers were caused by infection. The typical methods whereby viruses initiate oncogenesis involve suppressing the host's immune system, causing inflammation, or altering genes.

HHV-6 has been detected in lymphomas, leukemias, cervical cancers, and brain tumors. Various medulloblastoma cell lines as well as the cells of other brain tumors have been demonstrated to express the CD46 receptor. Viral DNA has also been identified in many other non-pathological brain tissues, but the levels are lower.

The human P53 protein functions as a tumor suppressor. Individuals who do not properly produce this protein experience a higher incidence of cancer, a phenomenon known as Li-Fraumeni syndrome. One of HHV-6's gene products, the U14 protein, binds P53 and incorporates it into virions. Another gene product, the ORF-1 protein, can also bind and inactivate P53. Cells expressing the ORF-1 gene have even been shown to produce fibrosarcomas when injected into mice.

Another product of HHV-6, the immediate early protein U95, has been shown to bind nuclear factor-kappa B. Deregulation of this factor is associated with cancer.

=== Optic neuritis ===
HHV-6 induced ocular inflammation has been reported three times. All three were reported in elderly individuals, two during 2007 and one during 2011. The first two were reported in Japan and France, the most recent one in Japan.

These were believed to have occurred as a result of a reactivation, as anti-HHV-6 IgM antibody levels were low.

=== Temporal lobe epilepsy ===
Epilepsy of the mesial temporal lobe is associated with HHV-6 infection. Within this region of the brain exists three structures: the amygdala, hippocampus, and parahippocampal gyrus. Mesial temporal lobe epilepsy (MTLE) is the most common form of chronic epilepsy and its underlying mechanism is not fully understood.

Researchers consistently report having found HHV-6 DNA in tissues that were removed from patients with MTLE. Studies have demonstrated a tendency for HHV-6 to aggregate in the temporal lobe, with the highest concentrations in astrocytes of the hippocampus.

However, one group of researchers ultimately concluded that HHV-6 may not be involved in MTLE related to mesial temporal sclerosis.

=== Liver failure ===
The virus is a common cause of liver dysfunction and acute liver failure in liver transplant recipients, and has recently been linked to periportal confluent necrosis. Furthermore, HHV-6 DNA is often detectable only in the biopsy tissues as DNA levels fall below the level of detection in blood in persistent cases.

== Treatment ==
There are no pharmaceuticals approved specifically for treating HHV-6 infection, although the usage of Cytomegalovirus treatments (valganciclovir, ganciclovir, cidofovir, and foscarnet) have shown some success. These drugs are given with the intent of inhibiting proper DNA polymerization by competing with deoxy triphosphate nucleotides or specifically inactivating viral DNA polymerases.

Finding a treatment can be difficult when HHV-6 reactivation occurs following transplant surgery because transplant medications include immunosuppressants.
