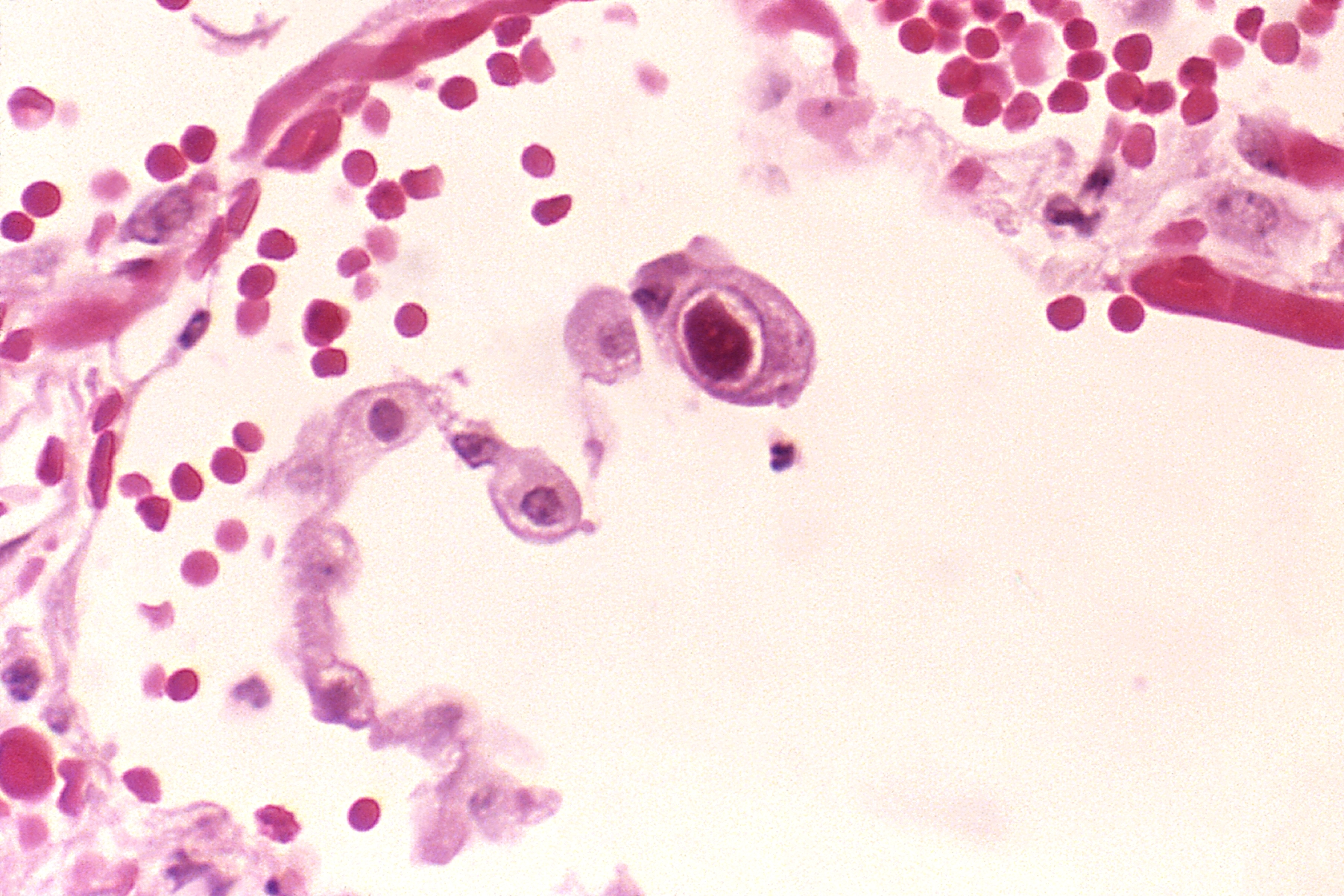
- Cytomegalovirus infection of a pneumocyte

Virus classification
- (unranked): Virus
- Realm: Duplodnaviria
- Kingdom: Heunggongvirae
- Phylum: Peploviricota
- Class: Herviviricetes
- Order: Herpesvirales
- Family: Orthoherpesviridae
- Subfamily: Betaherpesvirinae

Genera
- See text

= Betaherpesvirinae =

Subfamily of viruses

Betaherpesvirinae is a subfamily of viruses in the order Herpesvirales and in the family Orthoherpesviridae. Mammals serve as natural hosts. The subfamily contains five genera. Diseases associated with this subfamily include: human cytomegalovirus (HHV-5): congenital CMV infection; HHV-6: 'sixth disease' (also known as roseola infantum or exanthem subitum); HHV-7: symptoms analogous to the 'sixth disease'.

== Genera ==
Betaherpesvirinae consists of the following five genera:

- Cytomegalovirus
- Muromegalovirus
- Proboscivirus
- Quwivirus
- Roseolovirus

== Structure ==
Viruses in Betaherpesvirinae are enveloped, with icosahedral, spherical to pleomorphic, and Round geometries, and T=16 symmetry. The diameter is around 150-200 nm. Genomes are linear and non-segmented, around 140-240kb in length.

Genus	Structure	Symmetry	Capsid	Genomic arrangement	Genomic segmentation
Roseolovirus	Spherical pleomorphic	T=16	Enveloped	Linear	Monopartite
Cytomegalovirus	Spherical pleomorphic	T=16	Enveloped	Linear	Monopartite
Proboscivirus	Spherical pleomorphic	T=16	Enveloped	Linear	Monopartite
Muromegalovirus	Spherical pleomorphic	T=16	Enveloped	Linear	Monopartite

== Life cycle ==
Viral replication is nuclear, and is lysogenic. Entry into the host cell is achieved by attachment of the viral glycoproteins to host receptors, which mediates endocytosis. Replication follows the dsDNA bidirectional replication model. DNA templated transcription, with some alternative splicing mechanism is the method of transcription. Translation takes place by leaky scanning. The virus exits the host cell by nuclear egress and budding. Betaherpesviruses typically have highly restricted host ranges, although essentially all mammals, reptiles, and birds are infected with at least one betaherpesvirus species. Transmission routes are transplacental, transplantation, blood transfusion, body fluids, urine, and saliva.

Betaherpesvirinae establish latency (site where virus lies dormant until reactivated) in CD34+ myeloid progenitor cells and CD14+ monocytes. This is different from Alphaherpesvirinae, which establish latency in neurons, and Gammaherpesvirinae, which establish latency in memory B cells.

Genus	Host details	Tissue tropism	Entry details	Release details	Replication site	Assembly site	Transmission
Roseolovirus	Humans	T-cells; B-cells; NK-cell; monocytes; macrophages; epithelial	Glycoproteins	Budding	Nucleus	Nucleus	Respiratory contact
Cytomegalovirus	Humans; monkeys	Epithelial mucosa	Glycoproteins	Budding	Nucleus	Nucleus	Urine; saliva
Proboscivirus	Elephants	None	Glycoproteins	Budding	Nucleus	Nucleus	Contact
Muromegalovirus	Rodents	Salivary glands	Glycoproteins	Budding	Nucleus	Nucleus	Contact

== Human health ==
There are four known member species of the Betaherpesvirinae subfamily that are infectious for humans:

- Human cytomegalovirus (HCMV), also known as Human herpesvirus 5 (HHV-5),
- Human herpesvirus 6A and 6B (HHV-6A and HHV-6B), which were classified as distinct species in 2012,
- Human herpesvirus 7 (HHV-7)

Human cytomegalovirus (HCMV, HHV-5) "seems to have a large impact on immune parameters in later life and may contribute to increased morbidity and eventual mortality." Human herpesvirus 6A (HHV-6A) has been described as more neurovirulent, and as such is more frequently found in patients with neuroinflammatory diseases such as multiple sclerosis. Both human herpesvirus 6B (HHV-6B) and human herpesvirus 7 (HHV-7), as well as other viruses, can cause a skin condition in infants known as exanthema subitum, roseola infantum (rose rash of infants) or the sixth disease.
