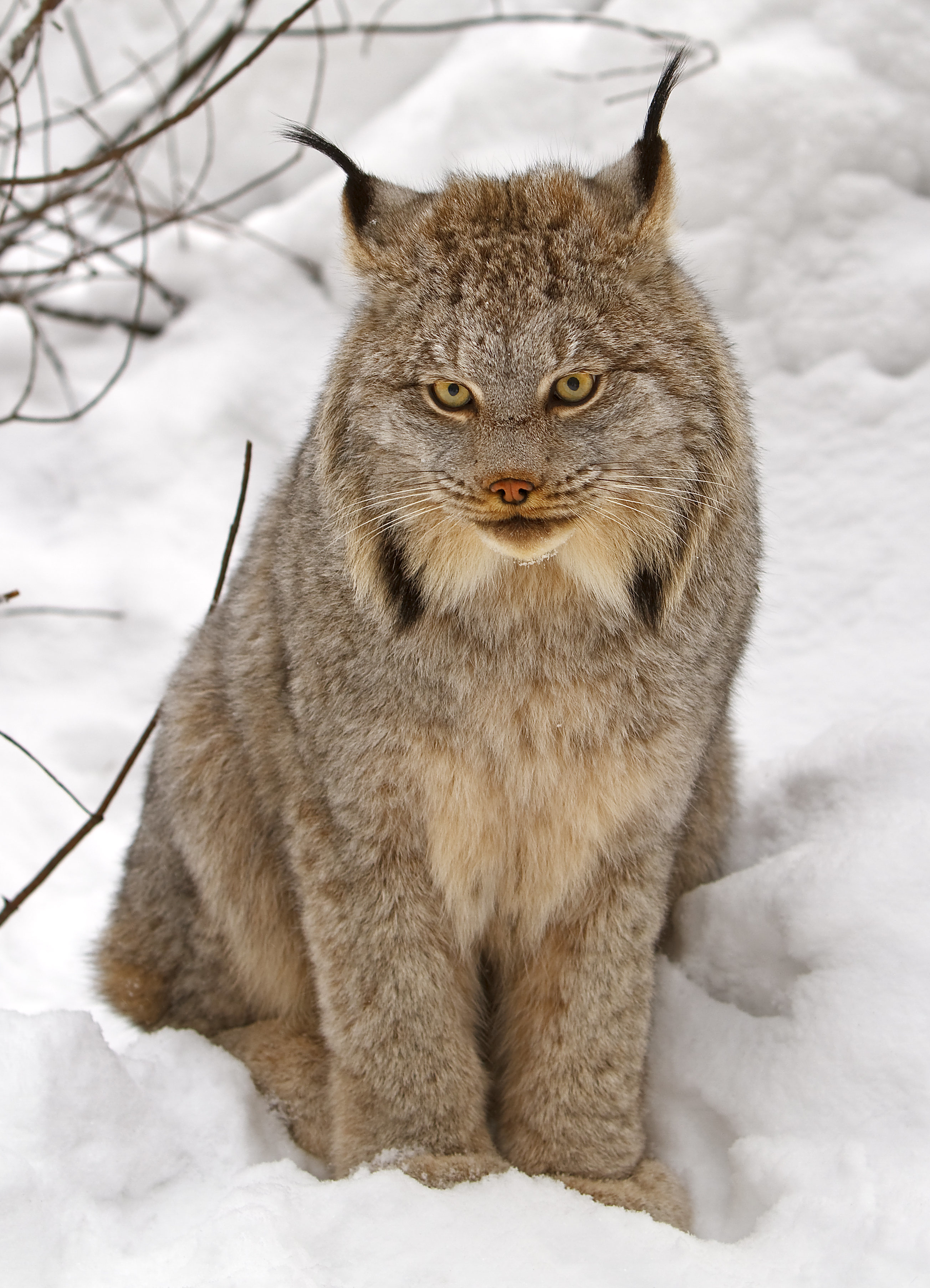

Conservation status
- Least Concern (IUCN 3.1)
- CITES Appendix II

Scientific classification
- Kingdom: Animalia
- Phylum: Chordata
- Class: Mammalia
- Infraclass: Placentalia
- Order: Carnivora
- Family: Felidae
- Genus: Lynx
- Species: L. canadensis

Binomial name
- Lynx canadensis Kerr, 1792

Subspecies
- See text
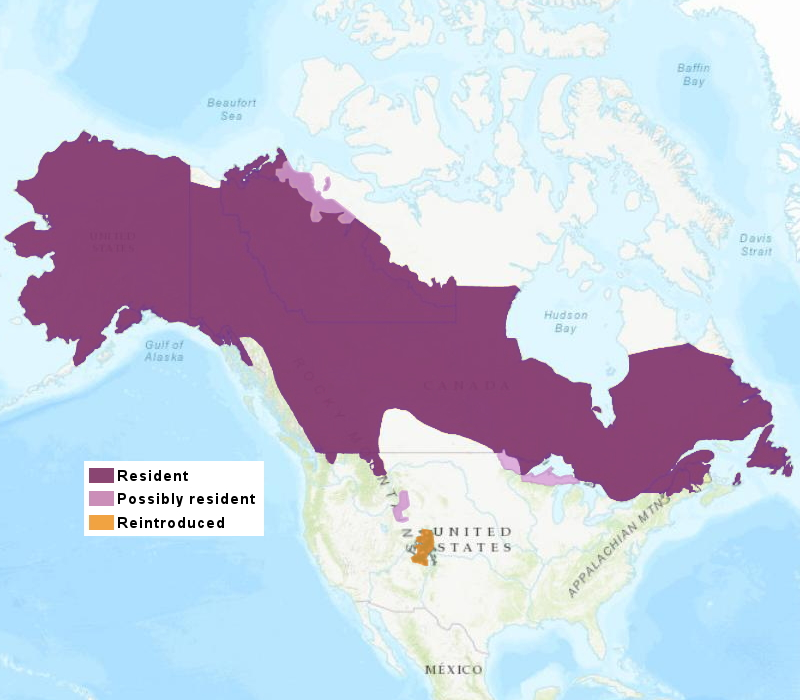
- Distribution of the Canada lynx (2016)

Synonyms
- List: Felis borealis Thunberg, 1798; F. cervaria Temminck, 1824; F. isabellina Blyth, 1847; F. kattlo Schrank, 1798; F. lupulinus Thunberg, 1825; F. lyncula Nilsson, 1820; F. lynx Linnaeus, 1758; F. pardina Temminck, 1824; F. virgata Nilsson, 1829; F. vulpinus Thunberg, 1825; Lynx cervaria Fitzinger, 1870; L. pardella Miller, 1907; L. sardinae Mola, 1908; L. vulgaris Kerr, 1792

= Canada lynx =

Medium-sized wild cat

The Canada lynx (Lynx canadensis) or Canadian lynx is one of the four living species in the genus Lynx. It is a medium-sized wild cat characterized by long, dense fur, triangular ears with black tufts at the tips, and broad, snowshoe-like paws. Its hindlimbs are longer than the forelimbs, so its back slopes downward to the front. The Canada lynx stands 48–56 cm (19–22 in) tall at the shoulder and weighs between 5 and 17 kg (11 and 37 lb). It is a good swimmer and an agile climber.

The Canada lynx was first described by Robert Kerr in 1792. Three subspecies have been proposed, but their validity is doubted; it is mostly considered a monotypic species. It ranges across Alaska, Canada and northern areas of the contiguous United States, where it predominantly inhabits dense boreal forests. It is a specialist predator and depends heavily on the snowshoe hare (Lepus americanus) for food. This leads to a prey-predator cycle, as the Canada lynx population responds to the cyclic rises and falls in snowshoe hare populations over the years in Alaska and central Canada. The Canada lynx population increases with an increasing hare population; if the hare population decreases in a given area, it moves to areas with more hares and has fewer offspring. The Canada lynx hunts mainly around twilight, or at night, when the snowshoe hare tends to be active. The Canada lynx waits for the hare on specific trails or in "ambush beds", then pounces on it and kills it by a bite on its head, throat or the nape of its neck. Individuals, particularly of the same sex, tend to avoid each other, forming "intrasexual" territories. The mating season is roughly a month long from March to early April. After a gestation of two to three months, females give birth to a litter of one to eight kittens, which are weaned at the age of 12 weeks.

Given its abundance throughout the range and lack of severe threats, the Canada lynx has been listed as Least Concern on the IUCN Red List. It is regularly trapped for the international fur trade in most of Alaska and Canada but is protected in the southern half of its range due to threats such as habitat loss.

== Taxonomy ==
The scientific name Felis lynx canadensis was proposed by Robert Kerr in 1792 who described a lynx from Canada. In the late 19th century, several lynx zoological specimens were described:

- Lynx subsolanus was proposed by Outram Bangs in 1897 for a lynx skin and skull collected near Codroy, Newfoundland.
- Lynx canadensis mollipilosus was proposed by Witmer Stone in 1900 who described a skull and a dark brown skin of a male lynx killed near Wainwright, Alaska.

The placement of the Canada lynx in the genus Lynx was supported by Gerrit Miller in 1912. Until as late as the early 2000s, scientists were divided over whether Lynx should be considered a subgenus of Felis, or a subfamily itself; some even doubted if the Canada lynx should be considered a species on its own. It was recognized by Wallace Christopher Wozencraft in 2005 as a valid Lynx species along with the bobcat (L. rufus), the Eurasian lynx (L. lynx) and the Iberian lynx (L. pardinus). Wozencraft recognized three subspecies of the Canada lynx:

- L. c. canadensis in Canadian mainland
- L. c. subsolanus in Newfoundland
- L. c. mollipilosus in Alaska

The validity of the subspecific status of the Newfoundland lynx was questioned in 1975, as results of a study of coat colour, cranial measurements and weights of Canada lynx specimens showed that the standard measurements are not significantly distinct, apart from a few variations like the Newfoundland lynx's darker coat.

In 2017, the Cat Specialist Group considered the Canada lynx a monotypic species, since it shows little morphological or genetic differences.

The lynx population on Newfoundland is thought to have genetically diverged from the mainland Canada lynx around 20,000 to 33,000 years ago following the Last Glacial Period.

== Evolution ==
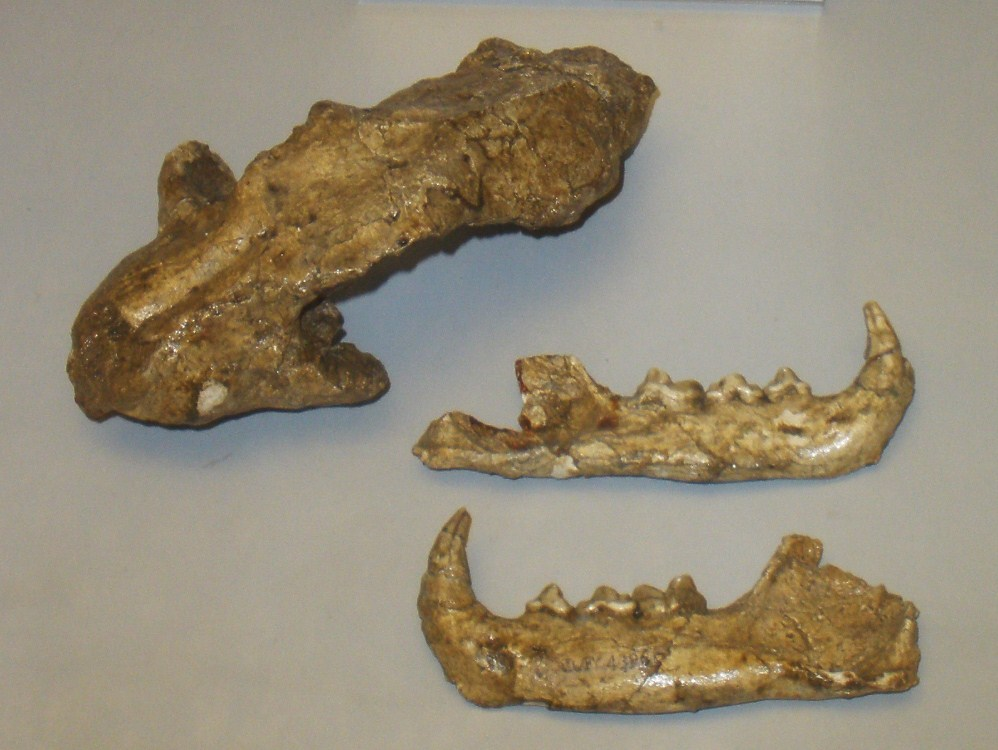
Fossils of the Issoire lynx (L. issiodorensis), which is thought to be the ancestor of the four modern Lynx species

According to a 2006 phylogenetic study, the ancestor of five extant felid lineages—Lynx, Leopardus, Puma, Felis and Prionailurus plus Otocolobus—arrived in North America after crossing the Bering Strait 8.5 to 8 million years ago (mya). Lynx diverged from the Puma, Felis and Prionailurus plus Otocolobus lineages around 2.53–4.74 mya. The Issoire lynx (L. issiodorensis), believed to be the ancestor of the four modern Lynx species, probably originated in Africa 4 mya and occurred in Europe and northern Asia until it fell to extinction around 1 mya. The populations of the Eurasian lynx that reached North America 2.6 mya are believed to have initially settled in the southern half of the continent, as the northern part was covered by glaciers. The southern populations gradually evolved into the modern bobcat. Later, when the continent was invaded by the Eurasian lynx for a second time within the last 200,000 years, the populations that settled in the northern part of the continent, now devoid of glaciers, evolved into the Canada lynx. In his 1981 paper, Swedish paleontologist Lars Werdelin noted that the Canada lynx does not appear to have changed much since its first appearance. Canada lynx fossils excavated in North America date back to the Sangamonian and the Wisconsin Glacial Episode. The 2006 study gave the phylogenetic relationships of the Canada lynx as follows:

- - Ocelot lineage
    Leopardus
  - - Lynx lineage
      - Lynx
        - Bobcat (L. rufus)
        - - Canada lynx (L. canadensis)
          - - Iberian lynx (L. pardinus)
            - Eurasian lynx (L. lynx)
    - - - Puma lineage
          Acinonyx (Cheetah), Puma (cougar), Herpailurus (jaguarundi)
        - - Domestic cat lineage
            Felis
          - Leopard cat lineage
            Prionailurus, Otocolobus

== Characteristics ==
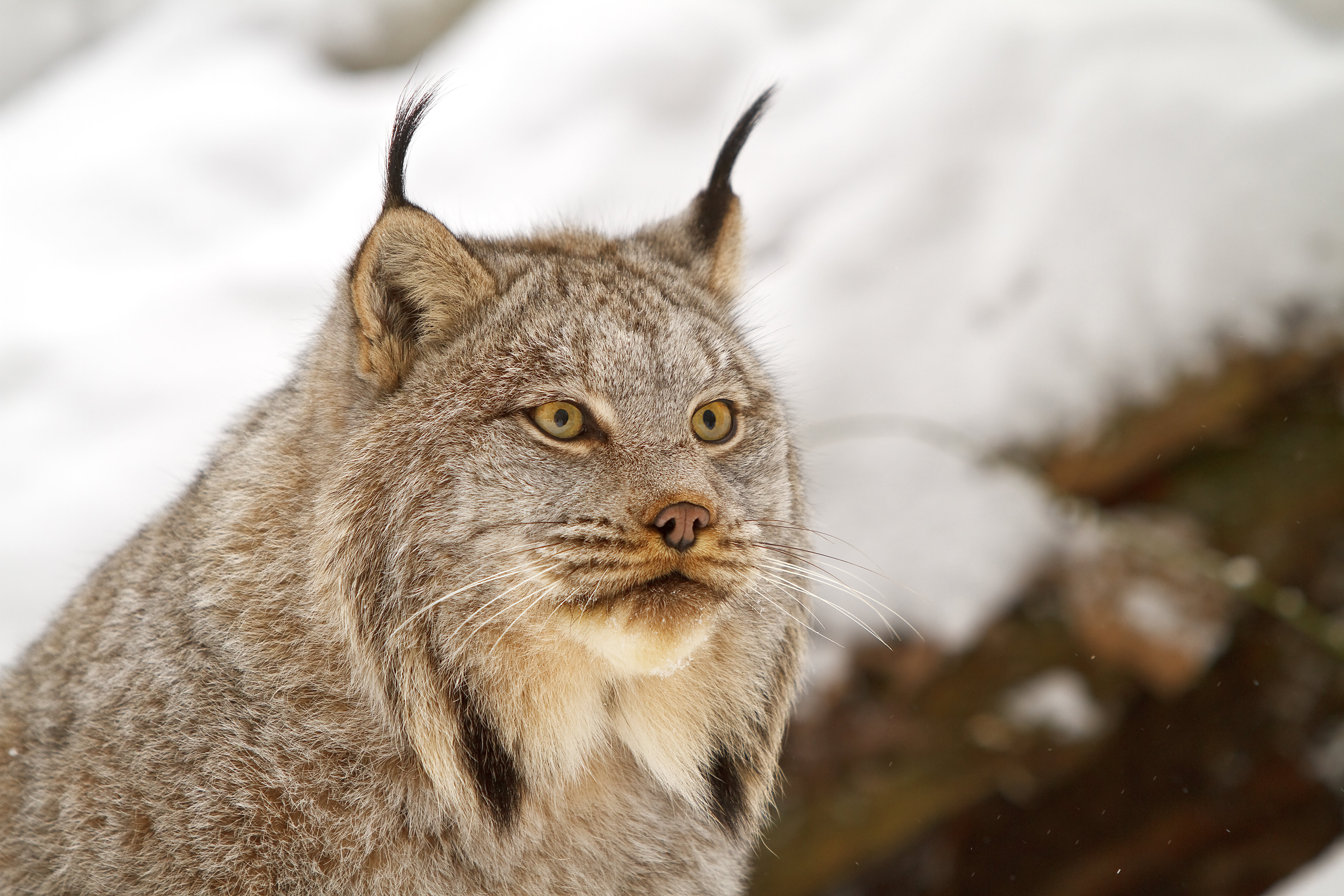
The Canada lynx has long hair on the lower cheek and ear tufts, characteristic of all Lynx species

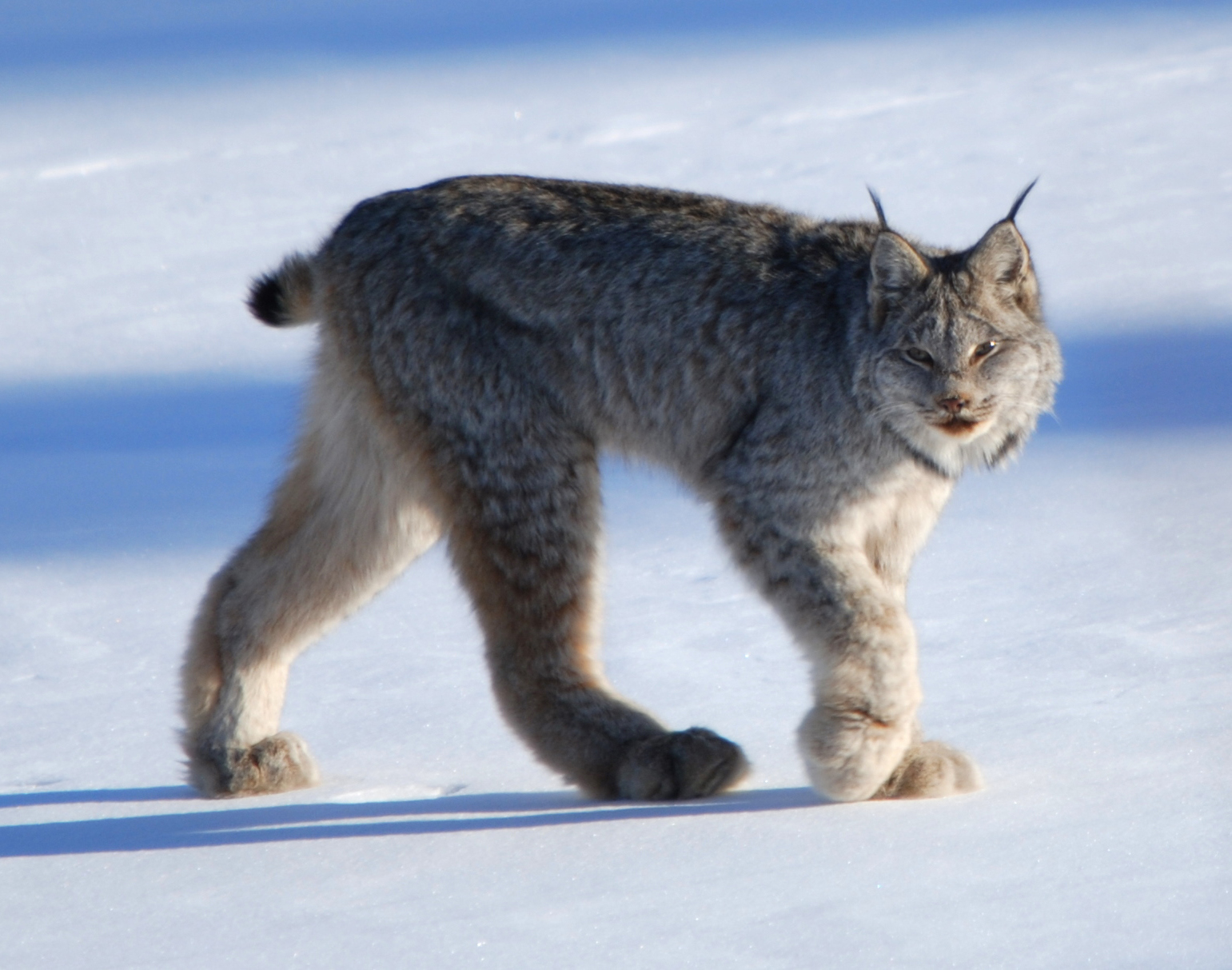
Its hindlimbs are longer than its forelimbs, causing it to slope downward toward the front

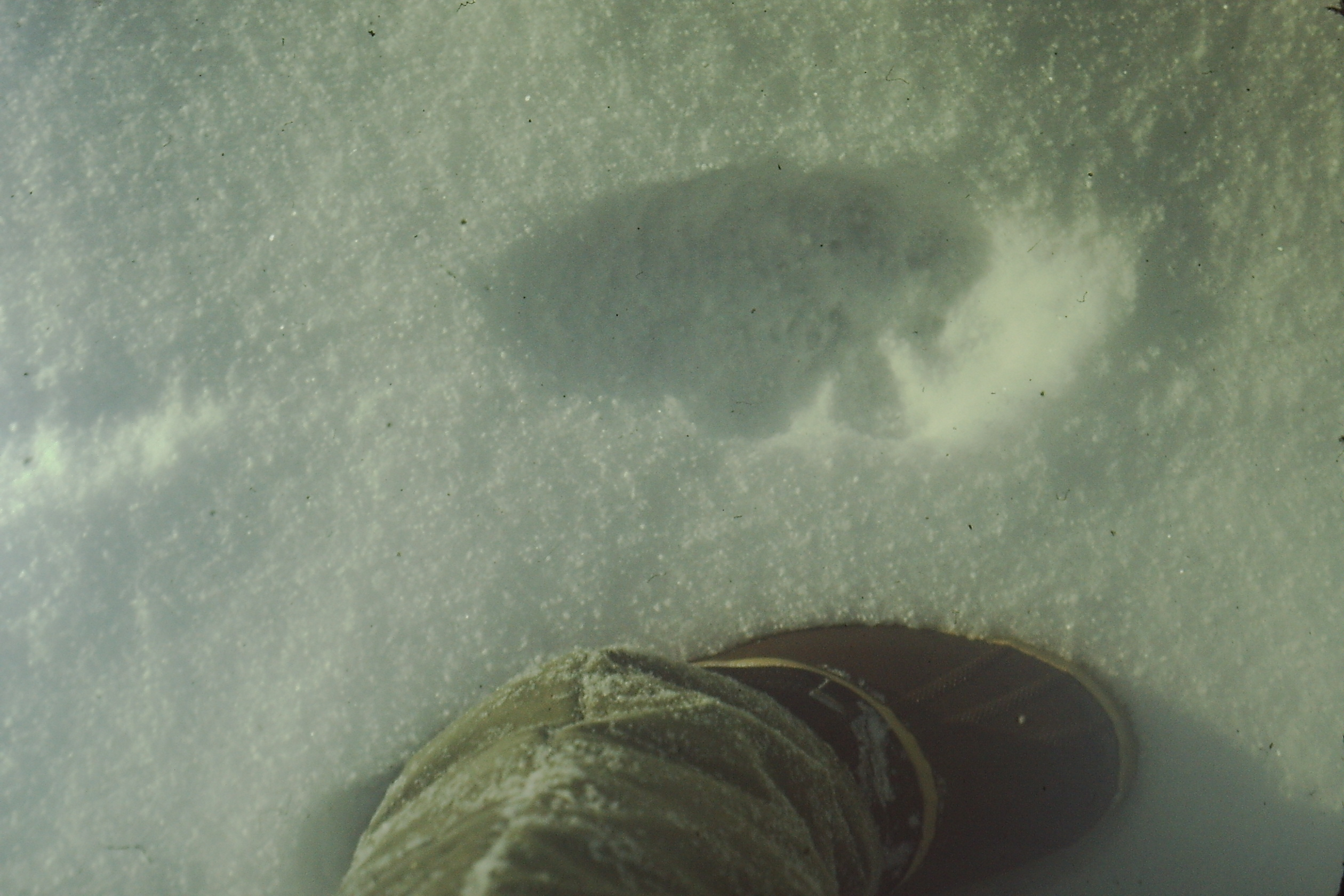
Tracks in snow

The Canada lynx is a lean, medium-sized cat characterized by its long, dense fur, triangular ears with black tufts at the tips, and broad, snowshoe-like paws. Like the bobcat, the hindlimbs are longer than the forelimbs, so the back slopes downward to the front. The Canada lynx is sexually dimorphic, with males larger and heavier than females. The lynx is between 73 and 107 cm (29 and 42 in) in total length and stands 48–56 cm (19–22 in) tall at the shoulder; females range in weight from 5–12 kg (11–26 lb) and males from 6–17 kg (13–37 lb), though an exceptional male in Pennsylvania weighed 20 kg (44 lb). Physical proportions do not vary significantly across the range and are probably naturally selected to allow for survival on smaller prey. The stubby tail is 5–13 cm (2.0–5.1 in) long and has a completely black tip. Skeletal muscles make up 56.5 % of the Canada lynx's body weight.

The long, thick fur, uniformly coloured with little to no markings except on the underside, insulates the lynx in its frosty habitat. The fur is typically yellowish brown, though in Newfoundland it can vary from brown or buff-grey in spring and summer to a greyish shade with a grizzled appearance in winter; the underparts are white and may have a few dark spots. An individual from Alaska was reported to have bluish-grey fur. The fur is generally shorter in summer than in winter. The backs of the ears are brown with a silvery-grey spot at the centre. Black tufts around 4 cm (1.6 in) in length emerge from the tips of the ears, which are lined with black fur. In winter, the hair on the lower cheek becomes longer, giving the impression of a ruffle covering the throat. There are four nipples.

The claws are sharp and fully retractile. The large, broad paws are covered in long, thick fur and can spread as wide as 10 cm (3.9 in) to move quickly and easily on soft snow. Its paws can support almost twice as much weight as a bobcat's before sinking. Both species walk with the back foot typically following the front foot and often do not follow a straight line. The lynx's stride is 300–460 mm (12–18 in), while the bobcat's varies between 130 and 410 mm (5 and 16 in). Canada lynx tracks are generally larger than those of the bobcat; thicker fur may make the toe pads appear less prominent in the snow. In dirt the tracks of the lynx are 76–95 mm (3–3.75 in) long and 89–114 mm (3.5–4.5 in) wide, whereas in snow they are bigger (110 mm (4.5 in) long and 130 mm (5 in) wide). The warm coat, wide paws and long legs serve as adaptations for the lynx to navigate and hunt efficiently in snow.

The Canada lynx has 28 teeth. The dental formula is 3.1.2.13.1.2.1. The deciduous dentition is 3.1.23.1.2, as the young do not have molars. The four long canines are used for puncturing and gripping. The lynx can feel where it is biting the prey with its canines because they are heavily laced with nerves. It also has four carnassial teeth that cut the meat into small pieces. To use its carnassials, the lynx must chew the meat with its head to its side. There are large spaces between the four canines and the rest of the teeth, and the second upper premolars are absent, to ensure the bite goes as deeply as possible into the prey.

The Canada lynx can be told apart from the bobcat by its longer ear tufts, broader paws, shorter tail with a fully black tip, longer legs and the fewer markings and greyer shade of the coat. The bobcat is generally smaller than the Canada lynx, but in areas where they are sympatric the bobcat tends to be larger and may still be confused with the Canada lynx.

== Distribution and habitat ==
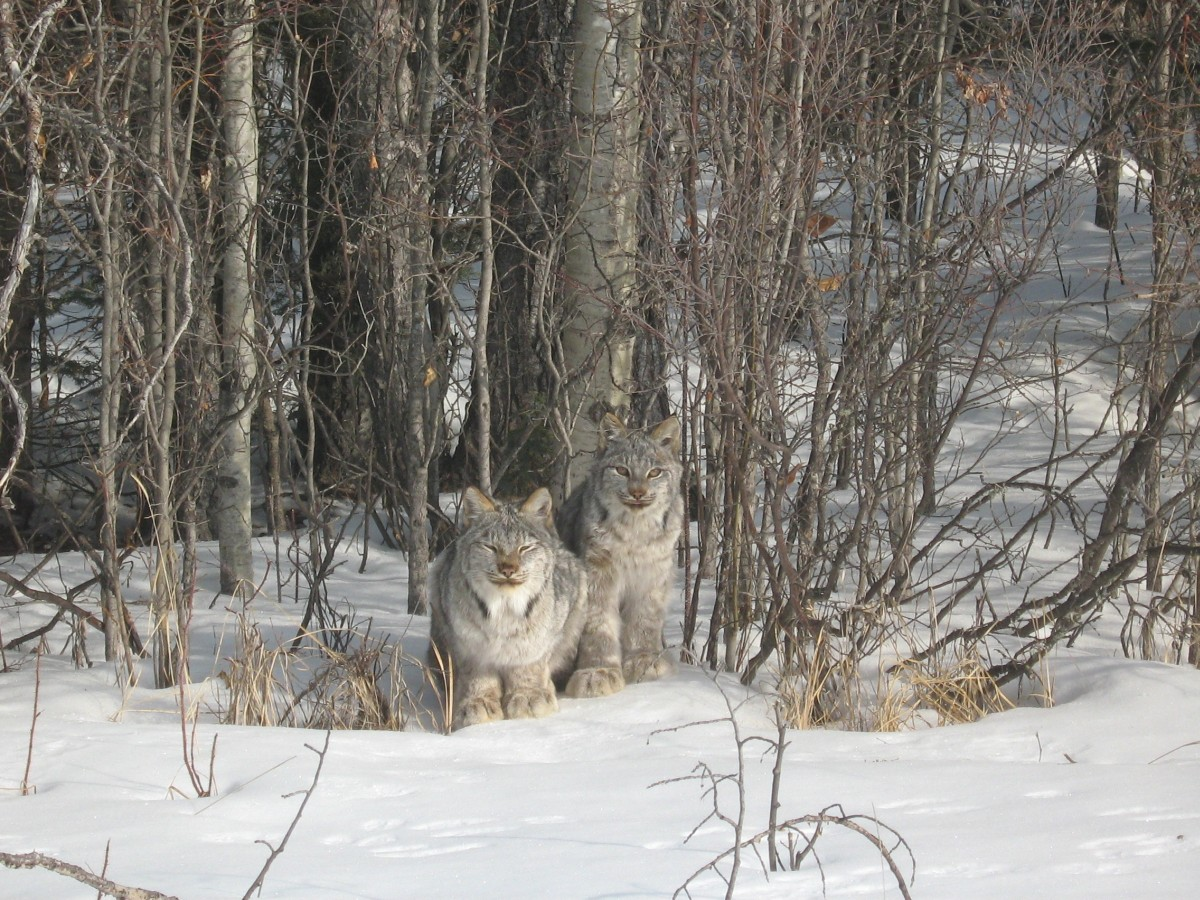
Canada lynxes prefer dense boreal forests

The Canada lynx occurs predominantly in the dense boreal forest of Canada, and its range strongly coincides with that of the snowshoe hare. In the past, the lynx occurred in the northern United States in 24 states, possibly southward to the Rocky Mountains in New Mexico and northward to the tree line in the Arctic through coniferous forests in Alaska and Canada. The lynx continues to occur in its former range in most of Alaska and Canada. In the United States, the Canada lynx occurs in the Blue Mountains and the Cascade Range in the Pacific Northwest, the Rocky Mountains, the northern Great Lakes region (in Minnesota and Michigan's Upper Peninsula) and northern New England (in New Hampshire, Maine and Vermont). The lynx was successfully reintroduced in Colorado starting in 1999, after being extirpated from the state in the 1970s. Canada lynxes generally avoid open areas despite good prey availability; they face difficulty surviving in heavily logged areas and on agricultural land, though they can thrive well in deforested areas that have been left to regenerate at least fifteen years. Canada lynxes have been recorded up to an elevation of 4,310 m (14,140 ft). It is considered extirpated in New York, Pennsylvania, Massachusetts, Nevada, Indiana, and Ohio. In February 2022, a picture of a large male Canada lynx was taken by a hunter in the southern Gros Ventre Range of Wyoming after his hounds treed the cat, making it the first confirmed sighting in the state since 2012.

== Ecology and behaviour ==
The Canada lynx tends to be nocturnal like its primary prey, the snowshoe hare. Nevertheless, activity may be observed during daytime. The lynx can cover 8–9 km (5.0–5.6 mi) daily, moving at 0.75–1.46 km/h (0.47–0.91 mph), to procure prey. These lynxes are good swimmers; one account records a Canada lynx swimming 3.2 km (2 mi) across the Yukon River. Canada lynxes are efficient climbers, and will dodge predators by climbing high up in trees, but they hunt only on the ground. These lynxes are primarily solitary, with minimal social interaction except for the bond between mothers and female offspring, and the temporary association between individuals of opposite sexes during the mating season. Individuals of the same sex particularly tend to avoid each other, forming "intrasexual" territories—a social structure similar to that of bears, bobcats, cougars and mustelids. Intraspecific aggression and consequent cannibalism are rare, but may be more common when food is scarce.

=== Home ranges ===
Canada lynxes are typically solitary with minimal social bonds.

Canada lynxes establish home ranges that vary widely in size, depending upon the method of measurement. The two common methods are examining the tracks of the lynx in snow (snow-tracking) and radio telemetry; snow-tracking generally gives smaller sizes for home ranges. Studies based on snow-tracking have estimated home range sizes of 11.1–49.5 km^{2} (4.3–19.1 sq mi), while those based on radio telemetry have given the area between 8 and 783 km^{2} (3.1 and 302.3 sq mi). Like other cats, Canada lynxes scent-mark their ranges by spraying urine and depositing feces on snow or tree stumps and other prominent sites in and around their range.

Factors such as the availability of prey (primarily snowshoe hare), the density of the lynxes and the topography of the habitat determine the shape and size of the home range. Studies have tried to correlate the abundance of snowshoe hares in an area with the sizes of lynxes' home ranges in that area. A 1985 study showed that the mean size of home ranges trebled—from 13.2 to 39.2 km^{2} (5.1 to 15.1 sq mi)—when the density of hares fell from 14.7 to 1/ha (5.95 to 0.40/acre). However, a few other studies have reported different responses from Canada lynxes at times of prey scarcity; some lynxes do not show any changes in their ranges, while others may resort to hunting in small areas, occupying small home ranges. Canada lynxes generally do not leave their home ranges frequently, though limited prey availability can force them to disperse or expand their ranges.

Males tend to occupy larger ranges than do females; for instance, data from a 1980 radio telemetric analysis in Minnesota showed that males' home ranges spread over 145–243 km^{2} (56–94 sq mi), while those of females covered 51–122 km^{2} (20–47 sq mi). In a study in the southern Northwest Territories, ranges of individuals of opposite sexes were found to overlap extensively, while the ranges of individuals of the same sex hardly coincided. The study suggested that individuals do not show any significant tendency to avoid or mingle with one another, and thus only passively defend their ranges. Female home ranges contract in size when the females have offspring to take care of and expand to their original size at the time of weaning.

Canada lynxes at the periphery of a population, given their smaller numbers and susceptibility to separation from the central population by natural barriers (such as rivers), might face more difficulty in breeding with lynxes towards the centre of the population and hence show lower genetic variability. However, Canada lynxes are known to disperse over large distances, often thousands of kilometres, which might increase genetic variability in widely separated populations. They typically move within areas where prey availability and the features of the snow (such as the hardness and the extent to which their paws sink into the snow) are more or less similar; individuals may disperse over smaller areas in areas of soft snow.

=== Diet and hunting ===
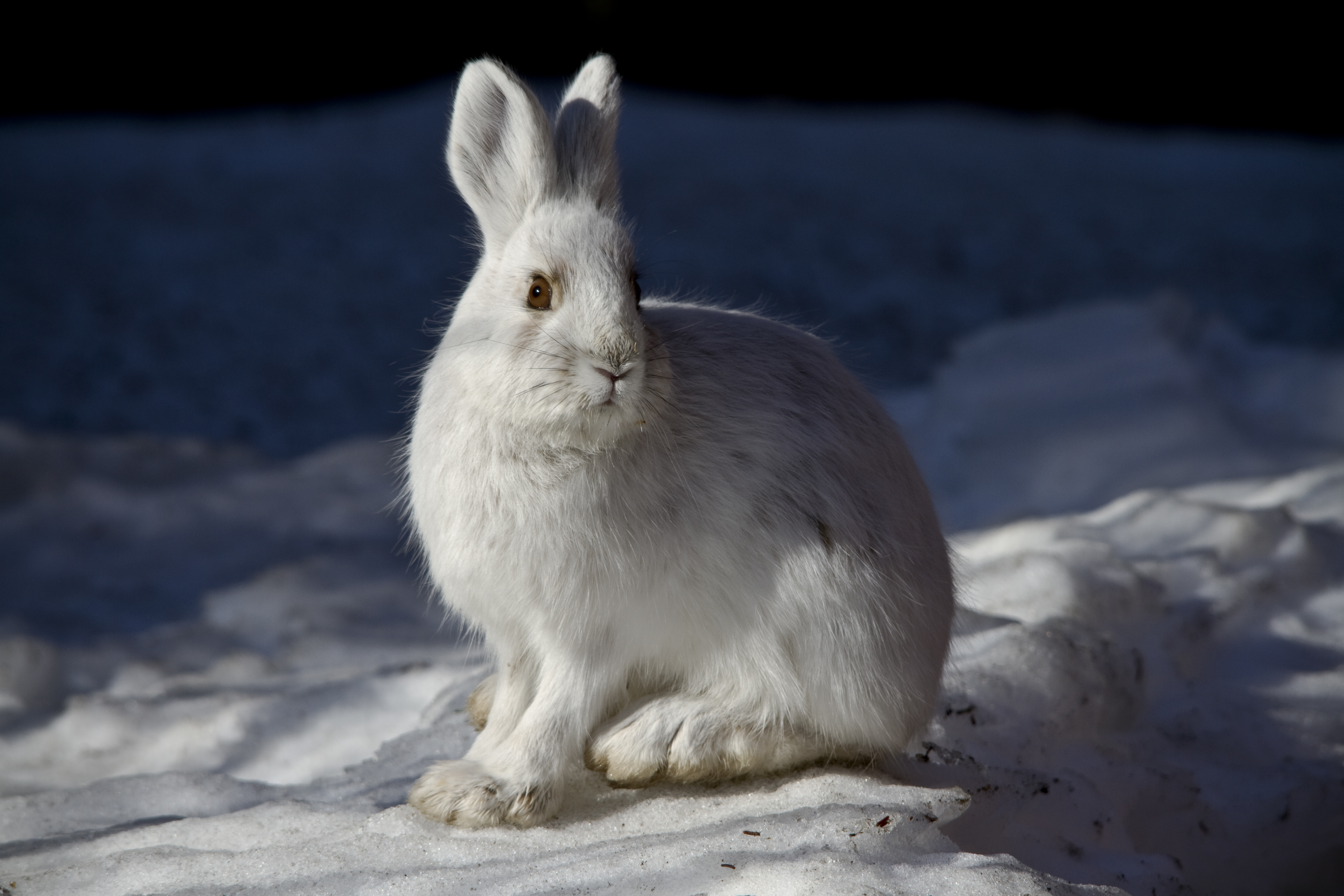
The snowshoe hare is the primary prey of the Canada lynx.

The Canada lynx preys primarily on the snowshoe hare. These hares comprise 35–97% of their diet; the proportion varies by the season and the abundance of hares. However, at times when the hare's numbers drop, Canada lynxes will include other animals in their diet—such as ducks, grouse, moles, ptarmigan, American red squirrels, voles and young ungulates (Dall's sheep, mule deer and boreal woodland caribou)—though snowshoe hares continue to be the primary component. The Canada lynx tends to be less selective in summer and autumn, adding small mammals to their diet besides the hare. The reason behind this is unclear—it could be due to a greater abundance of alternate prey, or reduced success in hunting hares. A study in Alaska found that lynxes played a role in the decrease in populations of red fox, caribou and Dall's sheep when hares were very low in number. They have also been reported feeding occasionally on succulents, sedges and grasses. Canada lynxes ingest 0.6–1.2 kg (1.3–2.6 lb) of food daily.

Canada lynxes hunt around twilight or at night, the time when snowshoe hares tend to be active. They rely on their vision and sense of hearing to locate prey. The lynx will roam or wait (in what researchers often term "ambush beds") on certain trails that snowshoe hares frequent, pounce on a hare and kill it by a bite on its head, throat or the nape of its neck. Sometimes a chase of up to several bounds may be necessary to trap the prey. The lynx is assisted by its stereoscopic vision in detecting prey and measuring distances. Staying in cover while hunting helps the lynx conserve energy in its frigid habitat by avoiding unnecessary movement. Young ungulates are given a throat bite to suffocate them to death. The lynx may eat its kill immediately or cache it in snow or leaves to eat it over the next few days. Studies suggest success in hunting hares depends heavily on the distance between the lynx and the hare when the lynx begins chasing it and their relative speeds, which in turn depends on the hunting prowess of the lynx, the alertness of the hare and the vegetation cover among other factors. Canada lynxes will occasionally hunt together, though studies differ on how this affects the success rate compared to hunting solo. These lynxes may hunt in groups when hares are scarce. Scavenging is common; they will take ungulates killed by the cold or vehicles.

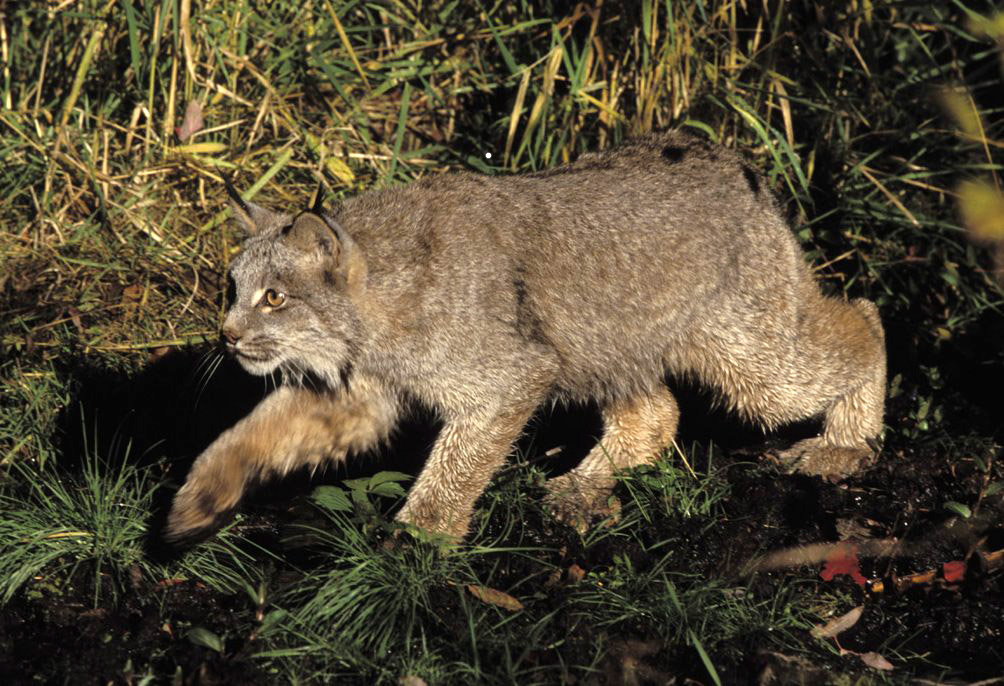
A Canada lynx stalking its prey

Apart from Canada lynxes, coyotes are also major predators of the snowshoe hare. A study showed that, compared to Canada lynxes, coyotes' feet sink deeper in the snow due to their smaller size and hence a larger body mass to foot area ratio, prompting them to ambush their prey instead of chasing it as lynxes often do. A study of those two animals in southwest Yukon showed that when the hare population increased, both killed more than necessary for subsistence; lynxes need to kill 0.4 to 0.5 hare per day to meet their energy requirements but were observed to kill 1.2 hares per day during this period. Coyotes, with a success rate of 36.9%, emerged as more successful hunters than lynxes that succeeded in 28.7% of their hunts; however, this may have resulted from the greater number of adult coyotes in the studied population. Lynxes rarely cached their kills, unlike coyotes, and this may have led to incomplete consumption of some kills. When snowshoe hare numbers declined, both predators hunted for the same time period as they did when hares were abundant, but lynxes killed more hares than they had earlier. Moreover, lynxes supplemented their diet with American red squirrels.

=== Relationship with the snowshoe hare ===
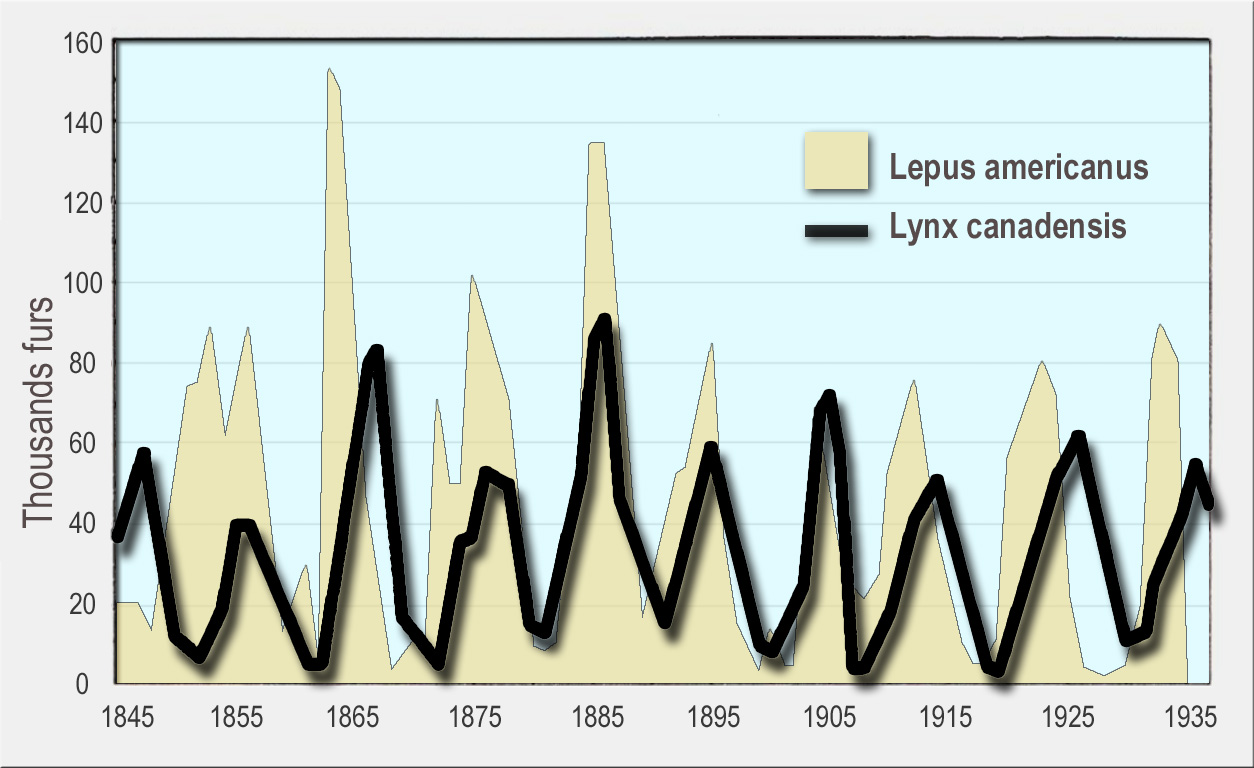
Numbers of snowshoe hare (Lepus americanus) (yellow background) and Canada lynx (black line, foreground) furs sold to the Hudson's Bay Company from 1845 to 1935

A specialist predator, the Canada lynx depends heavily on snowshoe hares for food. Snowshoe hare populations in Alaska and central Canada undergo cyclic rises and falls—at times the population densities can fall from as high as 2,300/km^{2} (6,000/sq mi) to as low as 12/km^{2} (31/sq mi). Consequently, a period of hare scarcity occurs every eight to 11 years. An example of a prey-predator cycle, the cyclic variations in snowshoe hare populations significantly affect the numbers of their predators—lynxes and coyotes—in the region. When the hare populations plummet, lynxes often move to areas with more hares, sometimes covering over 1,000 km (620 mi), and tend not to produce litters; as the hares' numbers increase, so does the lynx population. In northern Canada, the abundance of lynxes can be estimated from records maintained by the Hudson's Bay Company and the Canadian government since the 1730s. Lynx populations have been found to vary periodically three- to seventeen-fold. These cycles have been cited as an example of the Lotka–Volterra predator–prey equations, caused by the interplay of three major factors—food, predation and social interaction. A study involving statistical modelling of the interspecific relations of the snowshoe hare, the plant species it feeds on and its predators (including the Canada lynx) suggested that while the demographics of the lynx depend primarily on the hare, the hare's dynamics depend on both its diet and its predators, of which the Canada lynx is just one. Environmental factors such as forest fires, precipitation and snowfall might also significantly affect this prey-predator cycle.

=== Reproduction ===
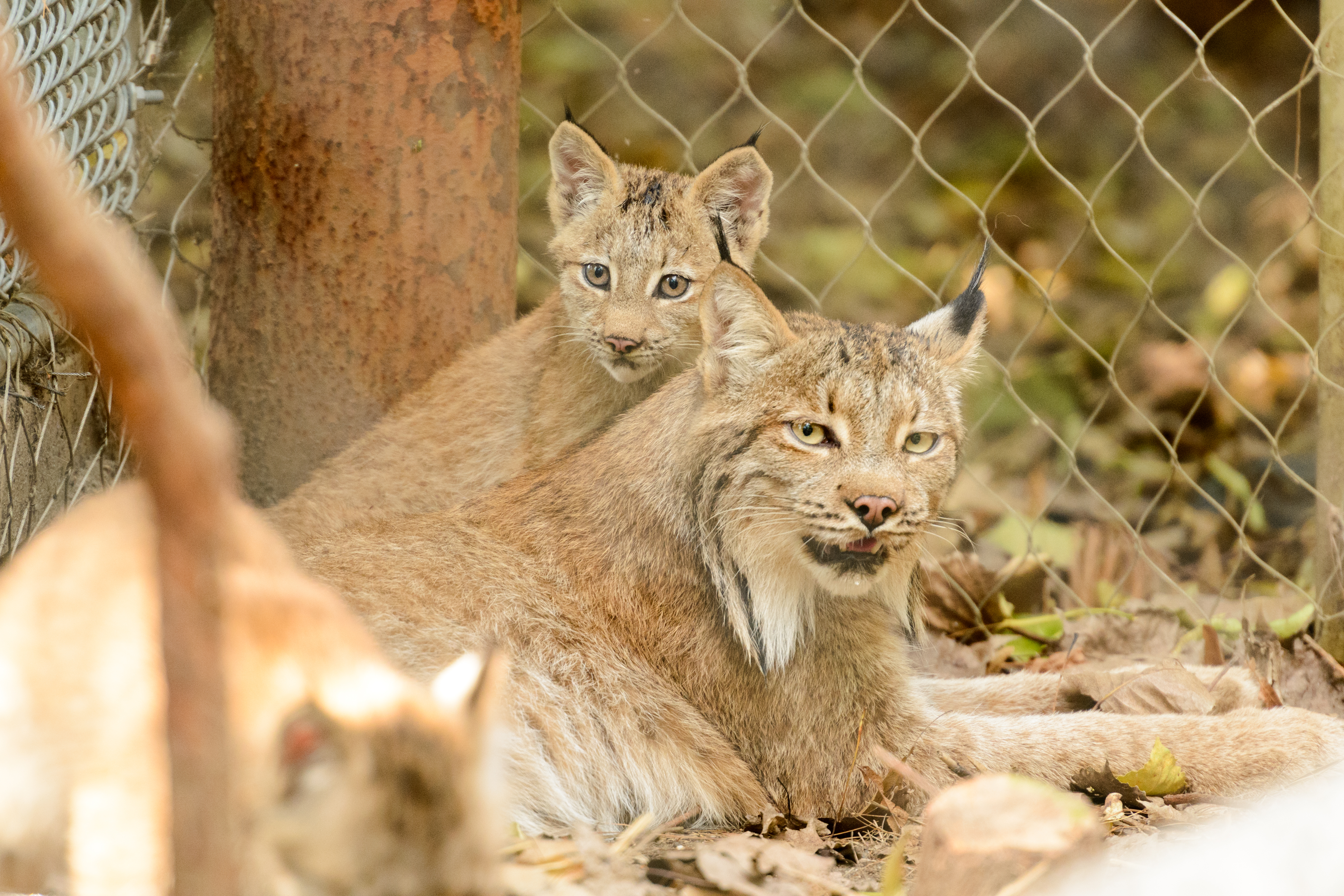
A mother and kitten

The mating season is roughly a month long, from March to early April. Urine marking and mating calls are part of display behaviour and increase the interaction between individuals of opposite sexes. Females can be induced ovulators when the availability of mates is low, or spontaneous ovulators when several mates are available. Females have only a single estrus cycle; estrus lasts three to five days in captivity. Individuals have been observed making long wailing vocalizations, probably as mating calls. Before birth, the female prepares a maternal den, usually in very thick brush, and typically inside thickets of shrubs, trees or woody debris.

After a gestation of two to three months, a litter of one to eight kittens is born. Lynx reproductive cycles and litter sizes have been observed to vary with prey availability; litter size would typically contract in years of snowshoe hare decline (along with high infant mortality rates), and increase when hares were abundant. Kittens weigh from 175 to 235 g (6.2 to 8.3 oz) at birth and initially have greyish buff fur with black markings. They are blind the first fourteen days and weaned at twelve weeks. Most births occur from May to July. Kittens leave the den after about five weeks and begin hunting at between seven and nine months of age. They leave the mother at around ten months, as the next breeding season begins, but they do not reach the full adult size until around two years of age. Female offspring typically settle in home ranges close to their mothers and remain in contact with them for life, while male offspring move far from their mother's range. Females reach sexual maturity at ten months but often delay breeding another year; males mature at age two or three. Canada lynxes have been reported to live sixteen years in the wild, though most do not survive ten; in captivity they may make it to twenty-seven.

=== Diseases and mortality ===
The Canada lynx is known to host several parasites including Cylicospirura felineus, Taenia species, Toxocara cati, Toxascaris leonina and Troglostrongylus wilsoni. Canada lynxes could have played a role in the transmission of the zoonotic parasite Toxoplasma gondii to the Inuit in North America. A study in 2019 identified a gammaherpesvirus species in the Canada lynx for the first time. The study discovered a novel percavirus, named LcaGHV1, in spleen samples of Canada lynxes from Maine and Newfoundland. A study identified plague as a major cause of mortality in reintroduced populations in Colorado.

Fishers are known to hunt Canada lynxes occasionally in the northeastern United States; a study in northern Maine identified predation by fishers as the leading cause of Canada lynx mortality over twelve years, though it did not appear to affect population growth in the lynxes.

== Interactions with humans ==
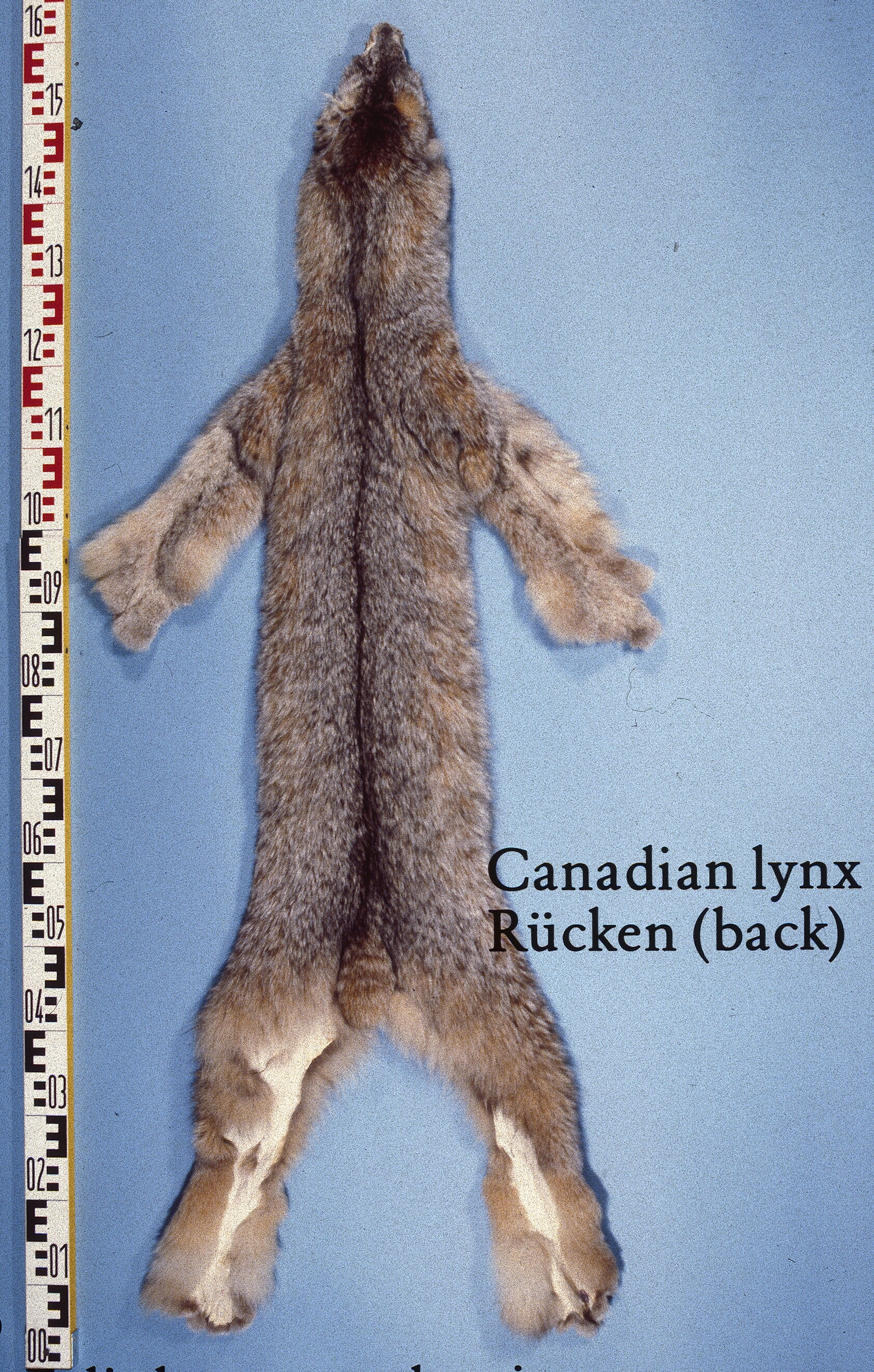
Pelt of a Canada lynx

=== Trade ===
Canada lynxes are trapped in specific seasons in most of Alaska and Canada; hunting seasons and quotas are set based on population data. Alberta typically leads in the production of pelts, accounting for nearly a third of Canada's total. Following a cyclic fall in populations during the mid to late 1980s, there was a sharp decline in the prices and harvest of Canada lynx furs—the average number of pelts exported from Canada and the United States fell from 35,669 in 1980–1984 to 7,360 between 1986 and 1989. Subsequently, the numbers have increased to 15,387 during 2000–2006. Average illegal trade in fur and live animals appears to be negligible on the national scale. Even without regulation, the lynx-hare cycles and the distribution of the lynx have remained unaffected over the last century.

A survey of the international wildlife trade between 1980 and 2004 recorded that among all lynxes, the Canada lynx accounted for thirty percent of legal items and had little part in illegal trade. While it was unclear which lynxes were preferred in North America, bobcat and Canada lynx furs appeared to be in greater demand than those of other lynxes in Asian and European markets.

=== Threats and conservation ===
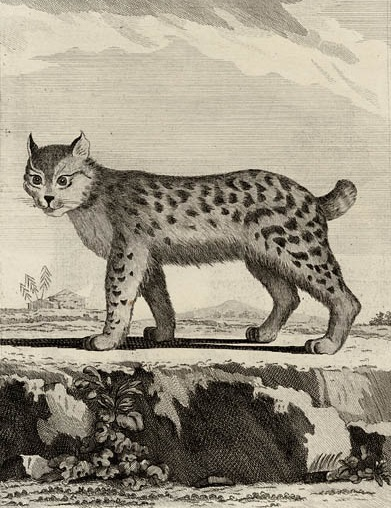
Illustration of a Canada lynx made around mid-18th century

In eastern Canada the lynx is threatened by competition with the eastern coyote, whose numbers in the region have risen in the last few decades. Habitat loss is the main threat in the contiguous United States, while trapping is a relatively insignificant cause of mortality. Hybridization between Canada lynxes and bobcats has been reported in the southern periphery of the range. Hybridization between closely related species might significantly delimit the geographic range of the species, especially if they are endangered as reproductive success in females would be reduced by the birth of sterile offspring; on the other hand, fertile hybrids can compete and breed further with the parent species, potentially reducing the numbers of the parent species. Canada lynx-bobcat hybrids have shown signs of reproductive success and do not appear to pose any significant threat to the parent species. The Canada lynx is abundant over its broad range and has not been significantly threatened by legal trade for centuries. Therefore, the International Union for Conservation of Nature and Natural Resources (IUCN) classifies the Canada lynx as Least Concern.

However, populations are relatively lower in the southern half of the range and are protected from the fur trade. The lynx is listed as Endangered in New Brunswick and Nova Scotia. On March 24, 2000, the US Fish and Wildlife Service (USFWS) issued its Final Rule, which designated the Canada lynx a Threatened Species in 14 contiguous states. In 2005, the USFWS demarcated six major areas for revival where lynx reproduction had been reported in the past two decades: northern Maine and New Hampshire, northeastern Minnesota, northwestern Montana and northeastern Idaho, the Kettle River Range and the "Wedge area" between the Kettle and Columbia rivers of Washington, the northern Cascade Range of Washington, and the Greater Yellowstone area of Wyoming, Montana and Idaho. By 2010, after an 11-year effort, the lynx had been successfully reintroduced into Colorado. The initial introduction was in the San Juan Mountains in southwestern Colorado, but self-sustaining populations were established throughout the south-central Colorado Rockies as far north as Summit County. A 2012 study showed numbers had improved in the northeastern United States; however, a 2008 study showed lynx populations were not doing well in Washington because of habitat fragmentation. A 2017 study reported increasing numbers in many areas in the United States. In January 2018, the USFWS declared that the Canada lynx no longer needed special protections in the United States following measures to preserve their populations, and their "Threatened" status may be revoked in the future.

Various techniques have been employed to study Canada lynx populations; the data collected can provide useful information on the ecology and distribution of the species and pave the way for effective conservation measures. In scent stations, the lynx is typically lured into camera-monitored areas by skunk scent (sometimes catnip) and a "flasher" such as a bird wing on a string. This technique, though systematic, might be too expensive to carry out in large areas. Other methods include radio telemetry and snow tracking. Snow tracking might be a challenge in areas lacking roads, and sometimes bobcat tracks can be mistaken for those of the Canada lynx. Hair-snaring involves collecting hairs shed by the lynx, especially when they rub against objects (such as the snow); a study showed a mixture of beaver castoreum and catnip oil can strongly induce rubbing behaviour in lynxes. This method is generally inexpensive, and chances of misidentification are low as physical evidence like hairs can be genetically analysed.

Between 1989 and 1992, a reintroduction attempt into New York State was made when 80 lynx were caught in from northwestern Canada and released into the Adirondacks by the State University of New York College of Environmental Science and Forestry. Some of the released lynx dispersed into the surrounding states of Pennsylvania, New Jersey, Massachusetts, New Hampshire and the Canadian provinces of Ontario, Quebec and New Brunswick. After the attempt, Canada lynx were officially considered extirpated in New York State, but are still fully protected under state law. Nineteen of the reintroduced lynx were killed in traffic accidents, eight were mistakenly shot by bobcat hunters, and the remaining died from unknown causes or predation.

== See also ==
- List of mammals of Canada
- List of mammals of Alaska
- List of mammals of the United States
