= Equine herpesvirus 5 =

Virus classification
- (unranked): Virus
- Realm: Duplodnaviria
- Kingdom: Heunggongvirae
- Phylum: Peploviricota
- Class: Herviviricetes
- Order: Herpesvirales
- Family: Orthoherpesviridae
- Genus: Percavirus
- Species: Percavirus equidgamma5

Synonyms
- Equid gammaherpesvirus 5; Equid herpesvirus 5; Equine herpesvirus 5

Species of virus

Equine herpesvirus 5 is a species of virus in the genus Percavirus, subfamily Gammaherpesvirinae, family Orthoherpesviridae, and order Herpesvirales. It is thought to be the cause of a chronic lung disease of adult horses; equine multinodular pulmonary fibrosis.
