= Equine multinodular pulmonary fibrosis =

- Specialty: Veterinary medicine

Equine multinodular pulmonary fibrosis is a chronic lung disease of horses. There is evidence that the disease is caused by infection with a gammaherpesvirus, equine herpesvirus 5. The disease usually affects adult horses reducing their ability to exercise as a result of the formation of nodular lesions in the lungs.

== Signs and symptoms ==
Signs of equine multinodular pulmonary fibrosis are mainly weight loss, fever, respiratory distress and depression. Unwillingness to move, mild cough and intermittent tachypnea have been reported. When the disease progresses, the general condition of the horse usually deteriorates, showing possible signs as severe dyspnea, hypoxemia or nasal discharge.

== Diagnosis ==
Generally EMPF has been categorized as an uncommon disease in horses with idiopathic origins. Comparing to other interstitial fibrosing lung diseases in horses, the lesions in EMPF differ remarkably due to their nodular pattern. In histologic examinations, a sharp border may be discerned between the fibrotic and intact lung tissue. Integrative fact among horses with EMPF has been frequently established to be an infection of EHV-5. Diagnosis is based on the PCR results and pathomorphological findings from lungs. The disease has been reported as part of the granumalomatous process in an apparent silicate pneumoconiosis. Among horses with diagnosed EMPF, thoracic radiography have shown several changes. Generalized mixed interstitial and nodular pattern in the lung parenchyma, large radiodense opacity in the caudodorsal area of the lung and thickened peribronchial walls. Thoracic ultrasonography have demonstrated a bilaterally generalized pleural roughening, several comet tails and multiple, hyperechogenic scattered areas.

== Pathology findings ==
Based on a study of 5 horses by T. POTH, G. NIEDERMAIER and W. HERMANNS (2009) as well as on a study of 24 horses investigated by WILLIAMS et al. (2007), there are significant pathomorphological findings in lungs with equine multinodular pulmonary fibrosis. In gross findings can be noticed pulmonary induration in all lung lobes as well as lesions restricted to the lungs and the bronchiolar lymph nodes. The distribution between two patterns can be seen as a large, whitish until tan and firm nodules of fibrosis. There are noticed histological findings, such as fibrosis and inflammation in different stages and degrees. In alveolies accumulation of neutrophils can be identified, and enlarged, vacuolated macrophages with several multinucleated giant cells. In addition hypertrophy of type II pneumocytes, formation on abnormal cystic airspaces and viral eosinophilic intranuclear inclusion bodies in intraluminal macrophages.

== Treatment and prognosis ==
Different treatments have been experimented with horses diagnosed EMPF, but the prognosis of EMPF is tentative to unfavorable.
