= List of mammals of Alaska =

This is a list of all mammals currently found in the U.S. state of Alaska, whether resident or as migrants. With 112 mammal species, Alaska ranks 12th of the 50 U.S. states in mammalian diversity. Not included in this list is the Steller's sea cow, an extinct sirenian that was once native to Alaska's Aleutian Islands before being hunted to extinction in 1768.

This article presents the common and scientific names for each species, along more information about the animal. Where the species is unique to Alaska, this article presents a brief overview of the species. Where the species is not unique to Alaska, this article gives information about the habits and distribution that are characteristic of animals occurring in the state. The range maps that accompany the descriptions vary in their precision according to the sources on which they are based. Readers are advised to click on the maps and examine the source information for more information on the species' ranges.

== Eulipotyphlans ==
Eulipotyphlans are insectivorous mammals. Alaska shrews have not been studied as much as most of its animals, so many particulars of their distribution, breeding cycles, and population remain unknown. Currently, ten species of shrews have been identified in Alaska, but debate remains over their identity and genetic relationships. All of Alaska's shrew species look alike to lay observers, but experts differentiate them based on their ranges and skull structure. Shrews live throughout the state, even on isolated islands, in habitats from temperate rain forests of the Southeast to Arctic tundra. They generally eat insects, spiders, and other small invertebrates, though they may also eat other vertebrates and plants. Their predators in Alaska include weasels, marten, fox, domestic cats, other shrews, and owls. Shrews may be helpful in agricultural areas by eating insects, but elsewhere they may be pests by eating household meat left uncovered. None of Alaska's shrew populations is threatened, with the possible exception of the Pribilof Island shrew.

Species	More information	Range
Glacier Bay water shrew Sorex alaskanus	Glacier Bay water shrews are known from Glacier Bay National Park and Preserve in southeast Alaska.	
Common shrew Sorex cinereus	The common shrew is one of the two most widespread species of shrew in Alaska (the other being the dusky shrew). It is found from the Brooks Range to Southeast Alaska.	
Pygmy shrew Sorex hoyi Image	The pygmy shrew is found throughout most of the state except the North Slope and the southeast.	
Pribilof Island shrew Sorex hydrodromus Image	The Pribilof Island shrew is found only on the Pribilof Islands.	
St. Lawrence Island shrew Sorex jacksoni	The St. Lawrence Island shrew is found only on St. Lawrence Island.	
Dusky shrew Sorex monticolus Image	The dusky shrew is one of the two most widespread species of shrew in Alaska (the other being the common shrew). It is found from the Brooks Range to Southeast Alaska.	
Water shrew Sorex palustris	The water shrew is found from Southcentral and Southeast Alaska to the Alaska Range in the north.	
Tundra shrew Sorex tundrensis	Tundra shrews are found throughout most of the state except the southeast.	
Barrenground shrew Sorex ugyunak Image	Barrenground shrews are found on the North Slope.	
Tiny shrew Sorex yukonicus Image	The tiny shrew appears to be widespread but uncommon in Alaska.	

== Bats ==
Bats are not abundant in Alaska, and are generally found only in Southeast Alaska, some of Southcentral Alaska, and in the Interior as far north as the Yukon River.

Species	More information	Range
Big brown bat Eptesicus fuscus	Only one big brown bat has ever been confirmed in Alaska. It is the largest bat in Alaska, weighing on average 14g (0.5 oz).	
California myotis Myotis californicus	As with other myotis species in Alaska, the California myotis often roosts in abandoned buildings and old mines; they may also be found roosting alone in trees or rock crevices. California bats have been observed hibernating in Southeast Alaska.	
Keen's myotis Myotis keenii	As with other myotis species in Alaska, Keen's myotis often roosts in abandoned buildings and old mines; they may also be found roosting alone in trees or rock crevices. It is suspected that it hibernates in Southeast Alaska.	
Little brown bat Myotis lucifugus	The little brown bat is the most common and widespread bat in Alaska. As with other myotis species in Alaska, little brown bats often roost in abandoned buildings and old mines; they may also be found roosting alone in trees or rock crevices. Little brown bats have been observed hibernating in Southeast Alaska and Kodiak Island.	
Long-legged myotis Myotis volans	As with other myotis species in Alaska, the long-legged myotix often roosts in abandoned buildings and old mines; they may also be found roosting alone in trees or rock crevices. It is suspected that it hibernates in Southeast Alaska.	
Silver-haired bat Lasionycteris noctivagans	After the big brown bat, the silver-haired bats is the largest bat in Alaska. It is only found in Southeast Alaska, and only during winter. It roosts alone in trees.	

== Carnivorans ==
=== Felids ===
Species	More information	Range map
Canadian lynx Lynx canadensis	Lynx live in a wide range in Alaska, but due to being mostly nocturnal and instinctively secretive predators they are rarely seen by humans. They share a "boom and bust" symbiotic life cycle with the snowshoe hare, the main animal they prey on. In times of booming hare population lynx are spotted more frequently as their numbers rise as well. After the lynx and other predators have decimated the hare population their numbers go down in the following years.	
Cougar; Puma concolor	It is unlikely that there is a breeding population of cougars in Alaska, but periodic sightings indicate that some cougars venture into the state. Generally the state receives two or three reports of cougar sightings per year. Reports have come from as far northwest as Homer, but the most credible reports come from the Southeast, which is relatively near an established population of cougars in British Columbia. Populations of mountain lions have been increasing in the American West and in Canada, and biologists have speculated that within fifty years Alaska could have a breeding population of its own.	

=== Canids ===
Species	More information	Range
Coyote; Canis latrans	Coyotes have only been seen in Alaska since the early 20th century; they were originally reported in Southeast Alaska, but have expanded across the state. The state's coyote population peaked in the 1940s and has declined in many areas since. Coyotes are most common in the Kenai Peninsula, the Mat-Su Valley, and the Copper River Valley and are rare north of the Yukon River. In Alaska, coyotes' diets consist primarily of snowshoe hares, rodents, and carrion; predators of the young include great horned owls, bald eagles, and golden eagles; adults are preyed upon by wolves, bears and cougars. The state offered bounties for killing coyotes in the early 20th century (as did other states); the bounty program ended in 1969, and today a small number of coyotes are trapped in Alaska each year. Because coyotes are very secretive, they are rarely seen by Alaska residents.	
Gray wolf Canis lupus	There are five subspecies of wolves in Alaska; the northwestern wolf, Interior Alaskan wolf, Alaskan tundra wolf, Alexander Archipelago wolf and Arctic wolf. Wolves in the southeast are darker and smaller than those in northern regions. Wolves are found on the mainland of Alaska, Unimak Island, and on most major islands in the southeast. There is approximately one wolf per 25 square miles (65 km^{2}) in Alaska. In recent years, efforts to control wolf population through aerial hunting have been a source of controversy in the state. The Arctic subspecies is also found in northern Canada.	
Arctic fox Vulpes lagopus	Arctic foxes are found in treeless coastal areas in the Aleutian Islands and on the state's west and north coasts. Two color morphs occur in the state: white-morph foxes are white in the winter and brown in the summer, while blue-morph foxes are charcoal-colored in summer and a somewhat lighter gray in winter. During the summer, Arctic foxes feed mainly on small animals, but during the winter foxes often venture onto sea ice to eat seal carcasses left by polar bears. Arctic foxes are sometimes trapped for fur; the fur trade is important to many coastal Native villages, though demand for Arctic fox fur has decreased in recent years. This subspecies is also found in Northern Canada.	
Red fox Vulpes vulpes	Red foxes are found throughout Alaska, except for the Western Aleutians, some islands in Southeast Alaska, and Prince William Sound. It is an introduced animal on many of the state's islands due to turn of the 20th century fox farming. Red foxes, which are most common south of the Arctic tundra, prefer low marshes, hilly areas, and broken country. Where the red fox's range overlaps with that of the Arctic fox, the red fox dominates. In Alaska, most red foxes are of the characteristic red color phase, but other color phases—which comprise up to 2% of foxes in certain northern areas—include "cross", silver, and black. Predators of red foxes include wolves, lynx, coyotes, wolverines, humans (primarily as trappers), and perhaps bears.	

=== Bears ===
Species	More information	Range
Black bear Ursus americanus	Black bears, which are much smaller than the state's brown bears, are found in larger numbers on the mainland of Alaska, but are not found on the islands off of the Gulf of Alaska and the Seward Peninsula. Black bears have been seen in Alaska in a few different shades of colors such as black, brown, cinnamon, and even a rare blue shade. They are widely scattered over Alaska, and pose more of a problem to humans because they come in close contact with them on a regular basis. They are considered a nuisance because they frequently stroll through local towns, camps, backyards, and streets because of their curiosity and easy food sources such as garbage. Black bears didn't live in Alaska until the end of the last ice age.	
Grizzly bear/Kodiak bear Ursus arctos ssp.	Alaska contains about 98% of the U.S. brown bear population and 70% of the total North American population. Brown bears can be found throughout the state, with the exclusion of some outlying islands. Most brown bears in Alaska are grizzly bears (the subspecies of brown bear found throughout North America), but Kodiak Island is home to Kodiak bears, another subspecies of brown bear that is the largest subspecies and second only to the polar bear in size. The density of brown bear populations in Alaska varies according to the availability of food, and in some places is as high as one bear per square mile. More information...	
Polar bear Ursus maritimus	Alaska's polar bear populations are concentrated along its Arctic coastlines. In the winter, they are most common in the Kuskokwim Delta, St. Matthew Island, and at the southernmost portion of St. Lawrence Island. During the summer months, they migrate to the coastlines of the Arctic Ocean and the Chukchi Sea. Conservation efforts, including the 1972 Marine Mammal Protection Act, have limited polar bear hunts, though polar bear populations may be threatened by oil development and global warming. More information...	

=== Pinnipeds ===
Species	More information	Range
Hooded seal Cystophora cristata	Hooded seals generally are found in the Atlantic Ocean, but occasionally individuals wander as far west as Alaska.	
Bearded seal Erignathus barbatus	Bearded seals are found in the parts of the Bering, Chukchi, and Beaufort seas where sea ice forms in the winter. Often weighing more than 750 pounds in the winter, they are the largest true seals found in Alaska waters. However, seasonal weight fluctuations typically result in adults weighing approximately 500 pounds during summer months. Bearded seals are generally solitary and migrate seasonally to follow moving sea ice. When sea ice recedes in summer, bearded seals are densely concentrated, but when sea ice occupies much of the northern seas during winter, bearded seals are much less densely populated. In the Bering and Chukchi seas, bearded seals generally eat crabs, shrimp, clams, snails, and some fishes. During breeding season, males fight frequently and "sing" underwater with a whistle that is partly audible to humans. Alaska Natives living in western coastal villages depend on bearded seals for hides and subsistence.	
Ribbon seal Histriophoca fasciata		
Elephant seal Mirounga angustirostris		
Harp seal Pagophilus groenlandicus		
Spotted seal Phoca largha		
Harbor seal Phoca vitulina		
Ringed seal Pusa hispida		
Northern fur seal Callorhinus ursinus	[	
Steller's sea lion Eumetopias jubatus		
California sea lion Zalophus californianus	Between 1974 and 2004, 54 California sea lions were reported in Alaska.	
Walrus; Odobenus rosmarus		

=== Mustelids ===
Species	More information	Range
Sea otter Enhydra lutris	Early Russian settlement of Alaska can largely be credited to the sea otter industry; sea otter fur is perhaps the finest in the world. Sea otters were hunted nearly to extinction in the late 19th century. In 1911, when sea otters were so scarce that hunting was no longer profitable, they were protected under the international Fur Seal Treaty, and after further conservation measures the sea otter population increased from 2,000 to between 110,000 and 160,000 from 1911 to the mid-1970s. Today, most of the species' original habitat in Alaska has been repopulated, except for some areas of the Southeast. In Southeast Alaska, where sea otters were reintroduced in the 1960s, sea otters continue to expand.	
Wolverine; Gulo gulo	Wolverines are found primarily in the more remote areas of mainland Alaska and on some islands in Southeast Alaska. Because wolverines require large amounts of wilderness (the home range of a male may be up to 240 sq. mi.), they are sparsely distributed throughout their range. Wolverines are solitary, except during the May–August breeding season. Wolverines are better adapted for scavenging than for hunting and are opportunistic eaters. During winter, they primarily eat the carcasses of animals that have died of natural causes and the carcasses of moose and caribou left by wolves and hunters. The rest of the year their diet consists of smaller animals, such as voles, squirrels, snowshoe hares, and birds. On rare occasions, wolverines may kill moose or caribou.	
North American river otter Lontra canadensis	River otters are found throughout Alaska except the Aleutian Islands, Bering Sea offshore islands, and the Arctic coast east of Point Lay.	
American marten Martes americana	American marten are found from Southeast Alaska to the start of treeless tundra in Alaska's north and west. They are abundant in Alaska, being most common in the bogs and black spruce forests of Interior Alaska. In much of their range, especially in less optimal habitat, meadow voles and red-backed voles are American martens' primary food source. Other important food sources include berries, small birds, eggs, plants, and carrion. Red squirrels, which are a major food source for American martens in other areas, are not generally eaten by American martens in Alaska. American martens are Alaska's most trapped animal, and as of 1994 generated $1–2 million in income in the state. In most areas, overtrapping is not a management problem.	
Pacific marten Martes caurina		
Beringian ermine Mustela erminea	Found throughout almost all of Alaska aside from some islands in the southeast	
Haida ermine Mustela haidarum	Found in the Alexander Archipelago.	
Least weasel Mustela nivalis		
American ermine Mustela richardsonii	Found in some parts of southeast Alaska	
Mink; Neogale vison	Mink are found in every region of Alaska except Kodiak Island, the Aleutian Islands, Bering Sea offshore islands, and most of the North Slope. Mink are opportunistic hunters, eating almost anything that they can kill; important food sources include fish, birds, bird eggs, insects, crabs, clams, and small mammals. Wolves, foxes, hawks, owls, lynx, and river otters occasionally prey on mink, but the effects of predation on mink population have been studied relatively little. In Alaska, mink are sometimes trapped for their fur.	
Fisher; Pekania pennanti		

== Even-toed ungulates ==
Species	More information	Range
Moose; Alces alces	The Alaska subspecies of moose (Alces alces gigas) is the largest in the world; adult males weigh 1,200 to 1,600 pounds (542–725 kg), and adult females weigh 800 to 1,300 pounds (364–591 kg) Alaska's substantial moose population is controlled by predators such as bears and wolves, which prey mainly on vulnerable calves, as well as by hunters. Moose are often hunted for subsistence and recreation. More information...	
Wood bison Bison bison athabascae	The American bison (Bison bison) was reintroduced to Alaska in 1928. In 2003, there were approximately 900 wild American bison in Alaska. Their numbers are controlled by managed sport hunting, as predation is not common. Bison can occasionally be seen on their summer range from the Richardson Highway south of Delta Junction, on the Delta Junction Bison range and on the Delta Agricultural Project. Another sub-species of bison, the wood bison (b. b. athabascae) are being reintroduced to the wild in Shageluk, Alaska. As of March 23, 2015, 70 of 100 wood bison have been released.	
Elk; Cervus canadensis	Elk are not native to the state and are introduced; individuals in Alaska are of the Roosevelt elk subspecies (C. c. roosevelti). Found in the southern tip of Alaska.	
Sitka deer Odocoileus hemionus sitkensis		
Caribou; Rangifer tarandus	Alaska is home to the Rangifer tarandus granti subspecies of caribou. Caribou in Alaska generally are found in tundra and mountain regions, where there are few trees. However, many herds spend the winter months in the boreal forest areas. Caribou in Alaska are abundant; currently there are an estimated 950,000 in the state. The populations of caribou are controlled by predators and hunters (who shoot about 22,000 caribou a year). More information...	
Mountain goat Oreamnos americanus	Mountain goats are found in the rough and rocky mountain regions of Alaska, throughout the Southeast and along the Coastal Mountains of the Cook Inlet. Populations are generally confined in the areas of the Chugach and Wrangell Mountains. Mountain goats have been transplanted to the islands of Baranof and Kodiak, where they have maintained a steady population. The mountain goat is the only representation in North America of the goat-like ungulates. Very little was known about mountain goats up until 1900. They constantly migrate to different areas from the alpine ridges in the summer, and to the tree-line in the winter.	
Muskox; Ovibos moschatus	Reintroduced; spread from Alaska refugium after the Pleistocene era, then died out in the state. Their current population is in Bering Land Bridge National Preserve, Arctic National Wildlife Refuge, Cape Krusenstern National Monument, Selawik National Wildlife Refuge, Kanuti National Wildlife Refuge, Gates of the Arctic National Park, and a local conservational farm in Palmer. They have also been reintroduced to Yukon.	
Dall sheep Ovis dalli	Dall sheep live in the mountain regions of Alaska where there is rocky terrain and steep, inclined land. The mountain setting is an ideal place for them to rest and feed. They are occasionally seen below their usual high elevation only when food is scarce. Alaska contains a good size population of thinhorn sheep. In their rocky environment, they are able to avoid predators and human activities.	

== Cetaceans ==
Species	More information	Range
Bowhead whale Balaena mysticetus	The Bering Sea stock of bowhead whales is the species' only population that exists in significant numbers, due to previous commercial whaling. While there were 18,000 Bering Sea bowheads before the introduction of commercial whaling, as of 1992 their population was only between 6,400 and 9,200. Bering Sea bowheads follow a 3,600-mile (5800 km) migration route, wintering in the Bering Sea, then moving through the Bering Strait, across the Chuckchi Sea, and into the Canadian Beaufort Sea for the summer. To Alaskan Inuit, bowhead whales are the most important subsistence animal, both culturally and nutritionally. Subsistence whale hunts are managed in accordance with the International Whaling Commission; 41 whales were taken in 1993.	
Minke whale Balaenoptera acutorostrata		
Sei whale Balaenoptera borealis		
Blue whale Balaenoptera musculus	Blue whales, which can be found in all the world's oceans, are rare north of the Bering Sea. Blue whales, which are migratory, may be seen in Alaska during the summer; historically, they have been sighted in the eastern Gulf of Alaska, the eastern Aleutians, and the far western Aleutians. Blue whales are rarely seen in near-shore Alaska waters, preferring to spend time along the edges of continental shelves. There have been few recent sightings of blue whales in Alaska; the total north Pacific population of blue whales was approximately 1,200 to 1,700 as of 1994, down from 4,900 to 6,000 before the advent of whaling. In the north Pacific, blue whales primarily eat the krill species Euphausia pacifica and Thysanoessa spinifera.	
Fin whale Balaenoptera physalus		
Beluga whale Delphinapterus leucas	During the summer, belugas eat a variety of fish, occasionally supplemented by other small marine life. Belugas' winter feeding habits are virtually unknown. Belugas are generally found in the ocean, but they may also ascend large rivers such as the Yukon on occasion and do not appear to be affected by the salinity change. There are two populations of belugas in Alaska. The Cook Inlet population is found in the inlet and Shelikof Strait region, and numbers approximately 400 to 500 animals. The larger Bering Sea population ranges throughout the Bering, Chukchi, and Beaufort seas; this group comprises perhaps 25,000 animals. Alaska natives harvest small numbers of belugas for food and oil.	
Gray whale Eschrichtius robustus		
North Pacific right whale Eubalaena japonica		
Short-finned pilot whale Globicephala macrorhynchus		
Risso's dolphin Grampus griseus		
Northern right-whale dolphin Lissodelphis borealis		
Humpback whale Megaptera novaeangliae	Humpback whales are most commonly seen in Alaska during the summer; most of Alaska's humpbacks winter in Hawaii. While in Alaska, humpbacks frequent Southeast Alaska, Prince William Sound, the area near Kodiak and the Barren Islands, the area between the Semidi and Shumagin Islands, and the eastern Aleutian Islands and southern Bering Sea. Studies in the early 1990s showed that over 500 humpbacks summered in Southeast Alaska and over 100 summered in Prince William Sound. In Alaska, humpback whales' primary sources of food are herring, other small schooling fish, and krill; their primary predators are killer whales and humans.	
Stejneger's beaked whale Mesoplodon stejnegeri		
Narwhal; Monodon monoceros	Occurs casually in Alaska waters.	
Killer whale Orcinus orca	The killer whale is also known as the orca whale because it has been known to attack and eat other whales, and large prey animals such as seals and sea lions. Orcas are scattered among the Continental Shelf from southeast Alaska through the Aleutian Islands. They can also be seen in the waters of Prince William Sound.	
Harbor porpoise Phocoena phocoena		
Dall's porpoise Phocoenoides dalli		
Sperm whale Physeter macrocephalus		
Pacific white-sided dolphin Sagmatias obliquidens		
Cuvier's beaked whale Ziphius cavirostris		

== Lagomorphs ==
Species	More information	Range
Snowshoe hare Lepus americanus	The snowshoe hare is the most common and widespread hare in Alaska, found everywhere in the state except the lower Kuskokwim Delta, the Alaska Peninsula, and the area north of the Brooks Range. They generally live in brush, mixed spruce forests, and wooded swamps. Snowshoe hare populations are dramatically cyclical, and in peak years there may be up to 600 snowshoe hares per square mi (230/km^{2}) of the animals' range. The hares are a key food source for Alaska's furbearers, especially lynx, and are also important for human subsistence and recreational hunting.	
Tundra hare Lepus othus	The tundra hare is most often found on the western coast of Alaska, including the Alaska Peninsula, and can occasionally be seen on the Arctic coast and the north slope of the Brooks Range. It generally lives on rocky slopes and upland tundra, avoiding lowlands and forests. They are important for subsistence and recreational hunting and for fur trapping.	
Collared pika Ochotona collaris		
European rabbit Oryctolagus cuniculus	Introduced species, found in and around some urban and suburban locales.	

== Rodents ==
Name	Range	More information
Beaver; Castor canadensis		
Northern collared lemming Dicrostonyx groenlandicus		
Nelson's collared lemming Dicrostonyx nelsoni		
Unalaska collared lemming Dicrostonyx unalascensis		
Porcupine; Erethizon dorsatum	Weighing approximately 15 pounds, porcupines are the largest of Alaska's rodents except for beavers. Porcupines are found everywhere in Alaska except the Alaska Peninsula and Kodiak, Nunivak, and St. Lawrence islands. In winter, porcupines primarily eat trees' inner bark; in summer, they eat trees' buds and young leaves. Porcupines can cause forest management problems when they eat terminal buds or eating bark all the way around trees, though in most parts of Alaska there are not enough porcupines to cause significant damage. Though porcupine's quills discourage most predators, fishers, lynx, wolves, coyotes, and wolverines have developed methods of killing porcupines safely. Porcupines are also easily killed by hunters because of their plodding gate, but they are generally unpopular among hunters because of their meat's strong taste. Porcupine quills are used by Alaska Natives for decoration of clothing; these are collected by cornering porcupines and tapping them with a styrofoam paddle. The porcupine didn't reached Alaska until the last ice age.	
Northern flying squirrel Glaucomys sabrinus		
North American brown lemming Lemmus trimucronatus		
Alaska marmot Marmota broweri	The Alaska marmot is found in the scree slopes of the Brooks Range, which provide protection from predators. They eat grass, flowering plants, berries, roots, moss, and lichen. Alaska marmots have special winter dens with a single entrance that is plugged during the entire winter hibernation period. They are built on exposed ridges that thaw earlier than other areas, and the entire colony stays within the den from September until the plug melts in early May. Most marmots mate before emerging from the winter den. In areas where marmots are hunted, marmots remain quiet when approached by humans; Alaska Natives have traditionally eaten marmot meat and used marmot fur in clothing.	
Hoary marmot Marmota caligata		
Woodchuck; Marmota monax		
St. Matthew Island vole Microtus abbreviatus	There have been relatively few observations of the St. Matthew Island vole, due to the inaccessibility of St. Matthew Island and the adjacent Hall Island, the only locations it has been found. On these Bering Sea islands, St. Matthew Island voles live in damp lowland areas, on the lower slopes of mountains, and on rye grass-covered beaches. They are diurnal and eat plant matter. Birds and Arctic foxes (the only other mammals on the island) prey on the voles.	
Long-tailed vole Microtus longicaudus	Long-tailed voles may be found throughout Southeast Alaska, the Yakutat forelands, and the far eastern Interior.	
Singing vole Microtus miurus	The distribution of the singing vole has not yet been well characterized. Specimens have been found on the North Slope, Seward Peninsula, Brooks Range, Alaska Range, south to the Kenai Peninsula and Cook Inlet, and west to Cape Newenham. There appear to be no singing voles in the Interior and Southeast.	
Tundra vole Microtus oeconomus		
Meadow vole Microtus pennsylvanicus		
Yellow-cheeked vole Microtus xanthognathus		
House mouse Mus musculus	Introduced.	
Northern red-backed vole Myodes rutilus	Northern red-backed voles are found throughout mainland Alaska. It is also found on Unimak Island and St. Lawrence Island, but not Southeast Alaska, Kodiak, or Nunivak Island.	
Southern red-backed vole Myodes gapperi		
Bushy-tailed woodrat Neotoma cinerea		
Muskrat; Ondatra zibethicus		
Forest deer mouse Peromyscus keeni		
Western deer mouse Peromyscus sonoriensis	Introduced	
Western heather vole Phenacomys intermedius	The first western heather vole specimen in Alaska was identified in 1999 near Hyder, Alaska.	
Norway rat Rattus norvegicus	Introduced.	
Arctic ground squirrel Spermophilus parryii		
Northern bog lemming Synaptomys borealis Image		
Red squirrel Tamiasciurus hudsonicus		
Meadow jumping mouse Zapus hudsonius		
Western jumping mouse Zapus princeps		

== See also ==
- Wildlife of Alaska
- List of mammals
- List of regional mammals lists
