= W. Chris Wozencraft =

American zoologist (1954–2007)

Wallace Christopher Wozencraft (1954–2007) was an American zoologist, specialising in smaller carnivorous mammals. He was professor of biology at Bethel College (Indiana), and chaired the committee on carnivorous mammals at the International Union for the Conservation of Nature and Natural Resources. He is the author of publications in his field.

Wozencraft was born in Tulsa, Oklahoma on May 25, 1953, and died January 6, 2007.
