= Bovine herpesvirus =

Bovine herpesvirus is a group of viruses from the family Herpesviridae that affect cattle.

- Bovine alphaherpesvirus 1 of subfamily Alphaherpesvirinae and genus Varicellovirus
- Bovine alphaherpesvirus 2 of subfamily Alphaherpesvirinae and genus Simplexvirus
- Bovine herpesvirus 3
- Bovine gammaherpesvirus 4 of subfamily Gammaherpesvirinae and genus Rhadinovirus
- Bovine alphaherpesvirus 5 of subfamily Alphaherpesvirinae and genus Varicellovirus
- Bovine gammaherpesvirus 6 of subfamily Gammaherpesvirinae and genus Macavirus
