= Ateline herpesvirus 2 =

Virus classification
- (unranked): Virus
- Realm: Duplodnaviria
- Kingdom: Heunggongvirae
- Phylum: Peploviricota
- Class: Herviviricetes
- Order: Herpesvirales
- Family: Orthoherpesviridae
- Genus: Rhadinovirus
- Species: Rhadinovirus atelinegamma2

Synonyms
- Ateline gammaherpesvirus 2; Ateline herpesvirus 2

Species of virus

Ateline herpesvirus 2 (AtHV-2) is a species of virus in the genus Rhadinovirus, subfamily Gammaherpesvirinae, family Orthoherpesviridae, and order Herpesvirales.

== See also ==
- HSUR (Herpesvirus saimiri U RNAs)
- Spider monkey (Ateles)
