= Equine herpesvirus 2 =

Virus classification
- (unranked): Virus
- Realm: Duplodnaviria
- Kingdom: Heunggongvirae
- Phylum: Peploviricota
- Class: Herviviricetes
- Order: Herpesvirales
- Family: Orthoherpesviridae
- Genus: Percavirus
- Species: Percavirus equidgamma2

Synonyms
- Equid gammaherpesvirus 2; Equid herpesvirus 2; Equine herpesvirus 2

Species of virus

Equine herpesvirus 2 (EHV-2) is a virus of the family Orthoherpesviridae, originally known as equine cytomegalovirus due to its slow replication in tissue culture. However, complete sequencing of the EHV-2 genome has demonstrated that it is a member of the subfamily Gammaherpesvirinae, in the genus Percavirus. It has an uncertain role in respiratory disease in horses, but EHV-2 has been isolated from cases exhibiting symptoms such as coughing, conjunctivitis, and swollen submaxillary and parotid lymph nodes.
