= Porcine lymphotropic herpesvirus 1 =

Virus classification
- (unranked): Virus
- Realm: Duplodnaviria
- Kingdom: Heunggongvirae
- Phylum: Peploviricota
- Class: Herviviricetes
- Order: Herpesvirales
- Family: Orthoherpesviridae
- Genus: Macavirus
- Species: Macavirus suidgamma3

Synonyms
- Porcine lymphotropic herpesvirus 1; Suid gammaherpesvirus 3

Species of virus

Porcine lymphotropic herpesvirus 1 is a species of virus in the genus Macavirus, subfamily Gammaherpesvirinae, family Orthoherpesviridae, and order Herpesvirales.
