= Hippotragine herpesvirus 1 =

Virus classification
- (unranked): Virus
- Realm: Duplodnaviria
- Kingdom: Heunggongvirae
- Phylum: Peploviricota
- Class: Herviviricetes
- Order: Herpesvirales
- Family: Orthoherpesviridae
- Genus: Macavirus
- Species: Macavirus hippotraginegamma1

Synonyms
- Hippotragine gammaherpesvirus 1; Hippotragine herpesvirus 1

Species of virus

Hippotragine herpesvirus 1 (HiHV-1) is a species of virus in the genus Macavirus, subfamily Gammaherpesvirinae, family Orthoherpesviridae, and order Herpesvirales.
