= Bovine malignant catarrhal fever =

Macavirus alcelaphinegamma1, Macavirus ovinegamma2

Virus classification
- (unranked): Virus
- Realm: Duplodnaviria
- Kingdom: Heunggongvirae
- Phylum: Peploviricota
- Class: Herviviricetes
- Order: Herpesvirales
- Family: Orthoherpesviridae
- Genus: Macavirus
- Species: Macavirus alcelaphinegamma1, Macavirus ovinegamma2

Synonyms
- Alcelaphine gammaherpesvirus 1 (AlHV-1); Ovine gammaherpesvirus 2 (OHV-2)

Species of virus

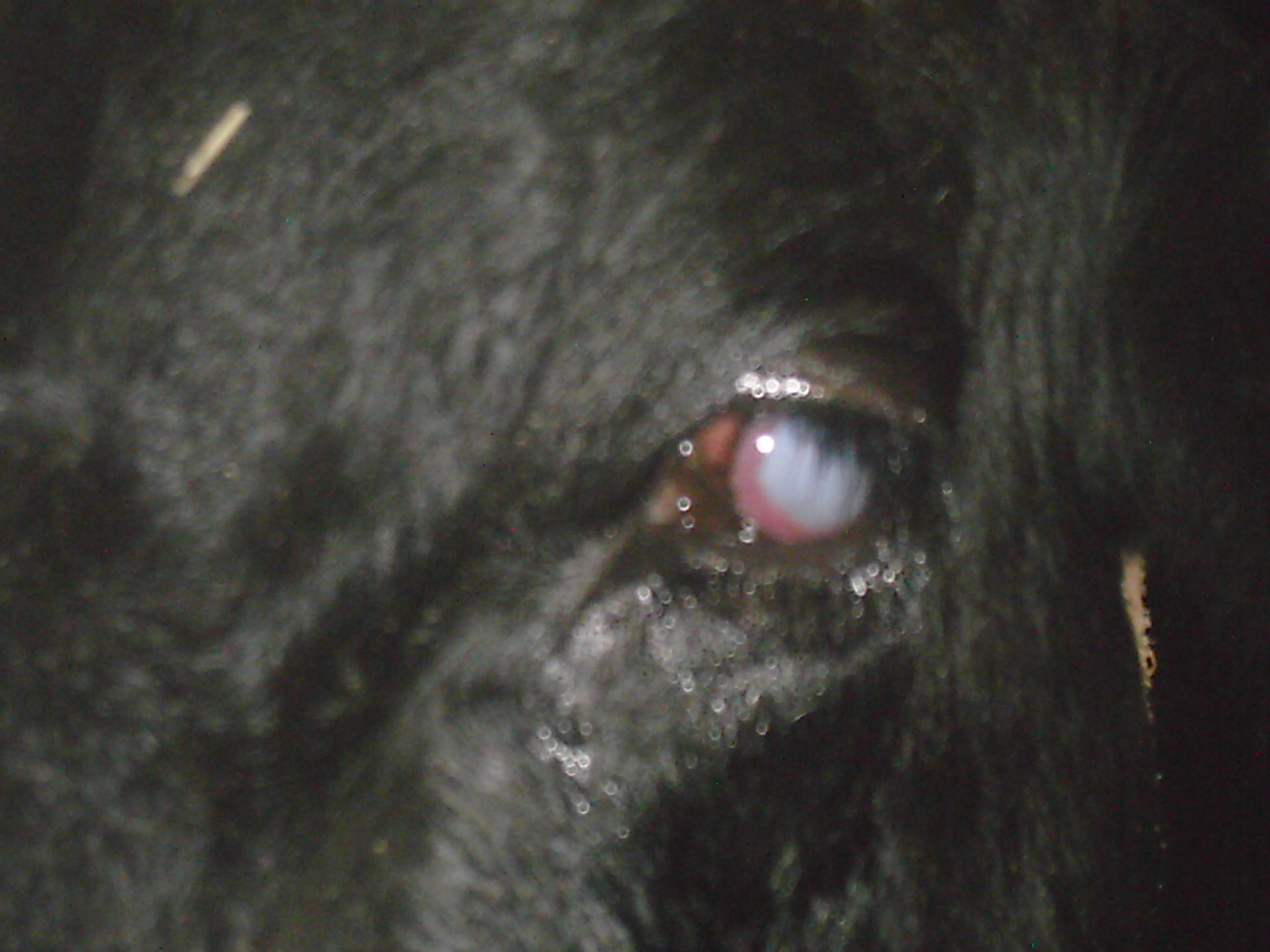
Eye Ring

Bovine malignant catarrhal fever (BMCF) is a fatal lymphoproliferative disease caused by a group of ruminant gamma herpes viruses, including Alcelaphine gammaherpesvirus 1 (AlHV-1) and Ovine gammaherpesvirus 2 (OvHV-2) These viruses cause unapparent infection in their reservoir hosts (sheep with OvHV-2 and wildebeest with AlHV-1), but are usually fatal in cattle and other ungulates such as deer, antelope, and buffalo. In Southern Africa the disease is known as snotsiekte, from the Afrikaans.

BMCF is most prevalent in areas where reservoir and susceptible animals mix. There is a particular problem with Bali cattle in Indonesia, bison in the US and in pastoralist herds in Eastern and Southern Africa.

Disease outbreaks in cattle are usually sporadic, although infection of up to 40% of a herd has been reported. The reasons for this are unknown. Some species appear to be particularly susceptible, for example Père David's deer, Bali cattle and bison, with many deer dying within 48 hours of the appearance of the first symptoms and bison within three days. In contrast, post infection cattle will usually survive a week or more.

== Epidemiology ==
The term bovine malignant catarrhal fever has been applied to three different patterns of disease:

- In Africa, wildebeests carry a lifelong infection of AlHV-1 but are not affected by the disease. The virus is passed from mother to offspring and shed mostly in the nasal secretions of wildebeest calves under one year old. Wildebeest associated MCF is transmitted from wildebeest to cattle normally following the wildebeest calving period. Cattle of all ages are susceptible to the disease, with a higher infection rate in adults, particularly in peripartuent females. Cattle are infected by contact with the secretions, but do not spread the disease to other cattle. Because no commercial treatment or vaccine is available for this disease, livestock management is the only method of control. This involves keeping cattle away from wildebeest during the critical calving period. This results in Maasai pastoralists in Tanzania and Kenya being excluded from prime pasture grazing land during the wet season leading to a loss in productivity. In Eastern and Southern Africa MCF is classed as one of the five most important problems affecting pastoralists along with East coast fever, contagious bovine pleuropneumonia, foot and mouth disease and anthrax. Hartebeests and topi also may carry the disease. However, hartebeests and other antelopes are infected by a variant, Alcelaphine herpesvirus 2.
- Throughout the rest of the world, cattle and deer contract BMCF by close contact with sheep or goats during lambing. The natural host reservoir for Ovine herpesvirus 2 is the subfamily Caprinae (sheep and goats) whilst MCF affected animals are from the families Bovidae, Cervidae and Suidae. Susceptibility to OHV-2 varies by species, with domestic cattle and zebus somewhat resistant, water buffalo and most deer somewhat susceptible, and bison, Bali cattle, and Père David's deer very susceptible. OHV-2 viral DNA has been detected in the alimentary, respiratory and urogenital tracts of sheep all of which could be possible transmission routes. Antibodies from sheep and from cattle with BMCF are cross reactive with AlHV-1.
- AHV-1/OHV-2 can also cause problems in zoological collections, where reservoir hosts and susceptible hosts are often kept in close proximity.
- Feedlot bison in North America not in contact with sheep have also been diagnosed with a form of BMCF. OHV-2 has been recently documented to infect herds of up to 5 km away from the nearest lambs, with the levels of infected animals proportional to the distance away from the closest herds of sheep.

The incubation period of BMCF is not known, however intranasal challenge with AHV-1 induced MCF in one hundred percent of challenged cattle between 2.5 and 6 weeks. Shedding of the virus is greater from 6–9 month old lambs than from adults. After experimental infection of sheep, there is limited viral replication in the nasal cavity in the first 24 hours after infection, followed by later viral replication in other tissues.

== Clinical signs ==
The most common form of the disease is the head and eye form. Typical symptoms of this form include fever, depression, discharge from the eyes and nose, lesions of the buccal cavity and muzzle, swelling of the lymph nodes, opacity of the corneas leading to blindness, inappetence and diarrhea. Some animals have neurologic signs, such as ataxia, nystagmus, and head pressing. Animals that become infected with the virus can become extremely sensitive to touch, especially around the head. It is also possible that become aggressive and charge at approaching animals and people. If the virus continues untreated, seizures could develop. Affected animal usually die five to ten days of the first signs of clinical signs. Once the cow shows clinical signs there is no chance of recovering.

Fulminant, alimentary and cutaneous clinical disease patterns have also been described. Death usually occurs within ten days. The mortality rate in symptomatic animals is 90 to 100% Treatment is supportive only.

== Factors ==
There are many factors that can increase the chances of infection or affect the severity of an outbreak. The number of animals in the herd, population density and species of the susceptible hosts are huge factors. Other factors include closeness of contact and amount of virus available for transmission.

== Diagnosis ==
Diagnosis of BMCF depends on a combination of history and symptoms, histopathology and detection in the blood or tissues of viral antibodies by ELISA or of viral DNA by PCR. The characteristic histologic lesions of MCF are lymphocytic arteritis with necrosis of the blood vessel wall and the presence of large T lymphocytes mixed with other cells. The similarity of MCF clinical signs to other enteric diseases, for example blue tongue, mucosal disease and foot and mouth make laboratory diagnosis of MCF important. The World Organisation for Animal Health recognises histopathology as the definitive diagnostic test, but laboratories have adopted other approaches with recent developments in molecular virology.

AlHV-1 and OvHV-2 are almost indistinguishable without molecular sequencing. However Anderson et al 2008 do find some usable differences, mostly necrosis or lack of necrosis, and lymphoid accumulation.

== Life cycle ==
Infection of T cells is typical of MCF group viruses. This was discovered by Nelson et al. 2010 by experimental infection of Bison bison with ovine strains. They additionally found B lymphocytes to be present but irrelevant in MCF lesions.

== Ovine ==
Ovine strains have been investigated by Meier-Trummer et al. 2009 (OvHV-2 experimentally in rabbits) and Nelson et al. 2013 (SA-MCF experimentally in Bison bison), both finding these to be lytic viruses.

== Bovine ==
=== Bison ===
Bison bison are found by Nelson et al. 2010 to suffer widespread mucosal necrosis but rarely occlusive thrombosis, and they judge thrombosis to be hardly able to explain the incidence of necrosis.

Nelson also find CD8^{+} and CD3^{+} to be the most common immune cell types in lesions.

=== Bos ===
CD8^{+} and CD4^{+} are the most common immune cell types in lesions found by Nelson et al. 2010.

== Prognosis ==
Bovine malignant catarrhal fever is usually fatal in susceptible species like cattle and bison, and any animal that survives will remain infectious for the rest of its life even if it shows no subsequent signs of the disease. Survivors may relapse and suffer attacks in later life. Latent infections may go unrecognised until recurrence, explaining signs of disease in animals with no known history of contact with reservoir species.

== Vaccine ==
A vaccine for malignant catarrhal fever (MCF) has not yet been developed. Developing a vaccine has been difficult, as the virus does not grow in cell cultures, and until recently, it was not known why this is. Researchers at the Agricultural Research Service (ARS) found that the virus undergoes changes within the animal's body, a process known as cell tropism switching. In cell tropism switching, the virus targets different cells at different points in its life cycle. This phenomenon explains why it has been impossible to grow the virus on any one particular cell culture.

Because the virus is transmitted from sheep to bison and cattle, researchers are first focusing on the viral life cycle in sheep. The viral life cycle is outlined in three stages: entry, maintenance, and shedding. Entry occurs through the sheep's nasal cavity and enters into the lungs where it replicates. The virus undergoes a tropic change and infects lymphocytes, also known as white blood cells, which play a role in the sheep's immune system. In the maintenance stage the virus remains on the sheep's lymphocytes and circulates the body. Finally, during the shedding stage, the virus undergoes another change and shifts its target cells from lymphocytes to nasal cavity cells, where it is then shed through nasal secretions. This discovery puts scientists closer to developing a vaccine – starting with the correct cell culture for each stage of the virus lifecycle – but ARS researchers are also looking into alternative methods to develop a vaccine. Researchers are experimenting with the MCF virus that infects topi (an African antelope) because it will grow in cell culture and does not infect cattle. Researchers hope that inserting genes from the sheep MCF virus into the topi MCF virus will ultimately be an effective MCF vaccine for cattle and bison.
