= Herpesvirus papio =

Virus classification
- (unranked): Virus
- Realm: Duplodnaviria
- Kingdom: Heunggongvirae
- Phylum: Peploviricota
- Class: Herviviricetes
- Order: Herpesvirales
- Family: Orthoherpesviridae
- Genus: Lymphocryptovirus
- Species: Lymphocryptovirus papiinegamma1

Synonyms
- Baboon lymphocryptovirus; Cercopithecine herpesvirus 12; Herpesvirus papio (HVP); Papiine gammaherpesvirus 1

Species of virus

Herpesvirus papio, also known as baboon lymphocryptovirus, is a species of virus in the genus Lymphocryptovirus, subfamily Gammaherpesvirinae, family Orthoherpesviridae, and order Herpesvirales.

This species was the first lymphocryptovirus isolated from a non-human primate to be described.
