= Murid herpesvirus 4 =

Virus classification
- (unranked): Virus
- Realm: Duplodnaviria
- Kingdom: Heunggongvirae
- Phylum: Peploviricota
- Class: Herviviricetes
- Order: Herpesvirales
- Family: Orthoherpesviridae
- Genus: Rhadinovirus
- Species: Rhadinovirus muridgamma4

Synonyms
- Murid gammaherpesvirus 4; Murid herpesvirus 4

Species of virus

Murid herpesvirus 4 (MuHV-4) is a species of virus in the genus Rhadinovirus. It is a member of the subfamily Gammaherpesvirinae in the family Orthoherpesviridae. This species infects mice via the nasal passages and causes an acute infectious mononucleosis-like syndrome with elevated levels of leukocytes, and shifts in the relative proportion of lymphocytes along with the appearance of atypical mononuclear cells. Murid herpesvirus 4 currently serves as a model for study of human gammaherpesvirus pathogenesis.

== Strains ==
Seven strains of Murid herpesvirus 4 have been isolated, including the following six:

- MuHV-Šum
- MuHV-60
- MuHV-68
- MuHV-72
- MuHV-76
- MuHV-4556
