= Vombatid herpesvirus 1 =

Virus classification
- (unranked): Virus
- Realm: Duplodnaviria
- Kingdom: Heunggongvirae
- Phylum: Peploviricota
- Class: Herviviricetes
- Order: Herpesvirales
- Family: Orthoherpesviridae
- Genus: Manticavirus
- Species: Manticavirus vombatidgamma1

Synonyms
- Vombatid gammaherpesvirus 1; Vombatid herpesvirus 1

Species of virus

Genomic information
- NCBI ID: GCA_018583145.1
- Genome size: 109,717 bases
- Year of completion: 2018

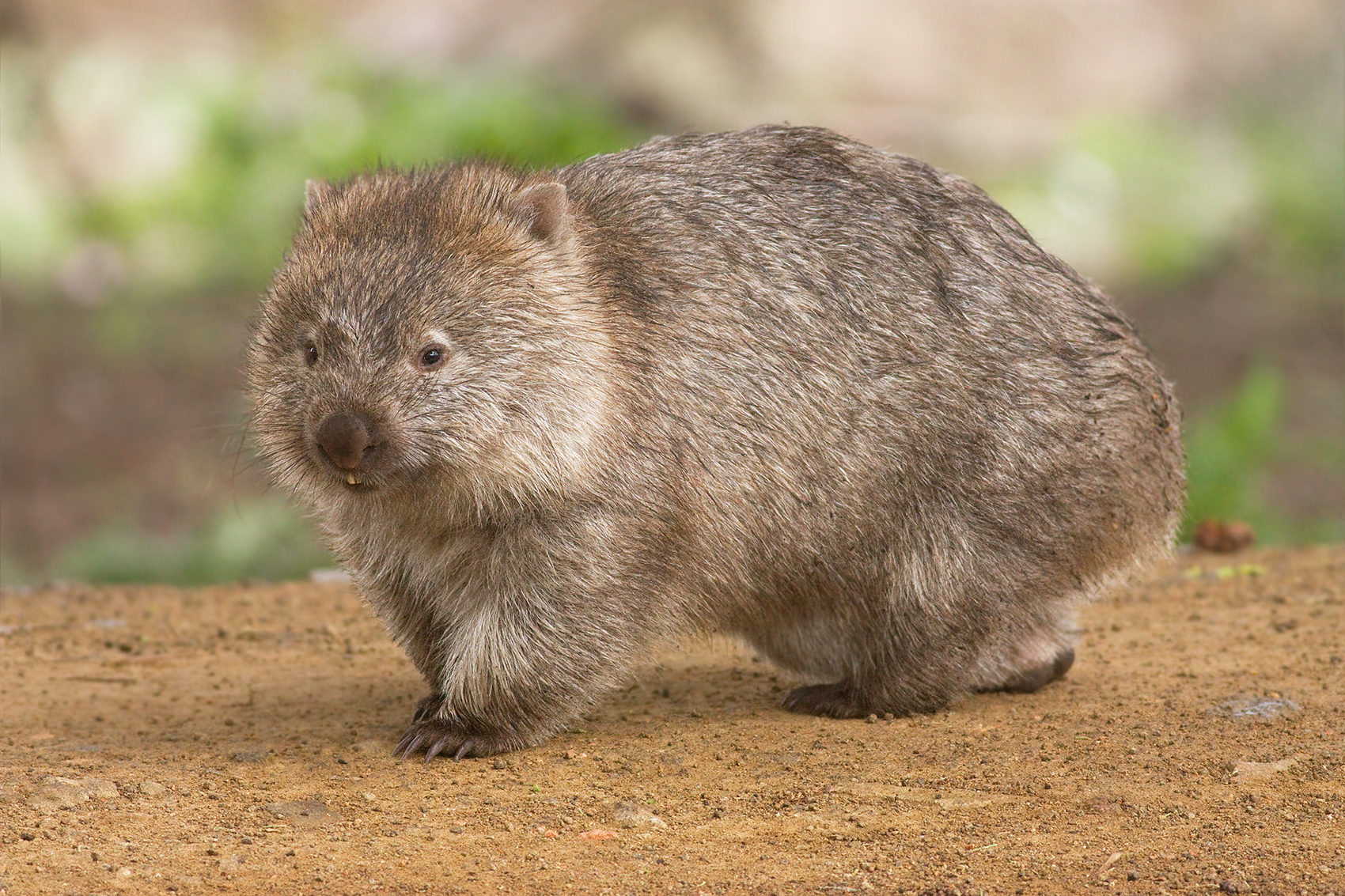
The virus is hosted by the common wombat (Vombatus ursinus).

Vombatid herpesvirus 1 (VoHV-1) is a species of virus in the genus Manticavirus that infect common wombats (Vombatus ursinus). The species is in subfamily Gammaherpesvirinae, family Orthoherpesviridae, and order Herpesvirales.
