= Bat gammaherpesvirus 8 =

Virus classification
- (unranked): Virus
- Realm: Duplodnaviria
- Kingdom: Heunggongvirae
- Phylum: Peploviricota
- Class: Herviviricetes
- Order: Herpesvirales
- Family: Orthoherpesviridae
- Genus: Percavirus
- Species: Percavirus vespertilionidgamma1

Synonyms
- Bat gammaherpesvirus 8; Vespertilionid gammaherpesvirus 1

Species of virus

Bat gammaherpesvirus 8 is a species of virus in the genus Percavirus, subfamily Gammaherpesvirinae, family Orthoherpesviridae, and order Herpesvirales.
