= Callitrichine herpesvirus 3 =

Virus classification
- (unranked): Virus
- Realm: Duplodnaviria
- Kingdom: Heunggongvirae
- Phylum: Peploviricota
- Class: Herviviricetes
- Order: Herpesvirales
- Family: Orthoherpesviridae
- Genus: Lymphocryptovirus
- Species: Lymphocryptovirus callitrichinegamma3

Synonyms
- Callitrichine gammaherpesvirus 3; Callitrichine herpesvirus 3; Marmoset lymphocryptovirus

Species of virus

Callitrichine herpesvirus 3 (CalHV-3) is a species of virus that infects marmosets. It is in the genus Lymphocryptovirus, subfamily Gammaherpesvirinae, family Orthoherpesviridae, and order Herpesvirales.
