= Cercopithecine gammaherpesvirus 14 =

Virus classification
- (unranked): Virus
- Realm: Duplodnaviria
- Kingdom: Heunggongvirae
- Phylum: Peploviricota
- Class: Herviviricetes
- Order: Herpesvirales
- Family: Orthoherpesviridae
- Genus: Lymphocryptovirus
- Species: Cercopithecine gammaherpesvirus 14

Synonyms
- African green monkey EBV-like virus

Species of virus

Cercopithecine gammaherpesvirus 14 (CeHV-14) is a species of virus in the genus Lymphocryptovirus, subfamily Gammaherpesvirinae, family Herpesviridae, and order Herpesvirales.
