= Pig-tailed macaque rhadinovirus 2 =

Virus classification
- (unranked): Virus
- Realm: Duplodnaviria
- Kingdom: Heunggongvirae
- Phylum: Peploviricota
- Class: Herviviricetes
- Order: Herpesvirales
- Family: Orthoherpesviridae
- Genus: Rhadinovirus
- Species: Rhadinovirus macacinegamma12

Synonyms
- Pig-tailed macaque rhadinovirus 2; Macacine gammaherpesvirus 12

Species of virus

Pig-tailed macaque rhadinovirus 2 is a species of virus in the genus Rhadinovirus, subfamily Gammaherpesvirinae, family Orthoherpesviridae, and order Herpesvirales.
