= Phascolarctid herpesvirus 1 =

Virus classification
- (unranked): Virus
- Realm: Duplodnaviria
- Kingdom: Heunggongvirae
- Phylum: Peploviricota
- Class: Herviviricetes
- Order: Herpesvirales
- Family: Orthoherpesviridae
- Genus: Manticavirus
- Species: Manticavirus phascolarctidgamma1

Synonyms
- Phascolarctid gammaherpesvirus 1; Phascolarctid herpesvirus 1

Species of virus

Phascolarctid herpesvirus 1 (PhaHV-1) is a species of virus in the genus Manticavirus, subfamily Gammaherpesvirinae, family Orthoherpesviridae, and order Herpesvirales.

== Host ==
Genomic information
- NCBI ID: GCA_018583155.1
- Genome size: 116,729 bases
- Year of completion: 2021

It is hosted by the koala (Phascolarctos cinereus).

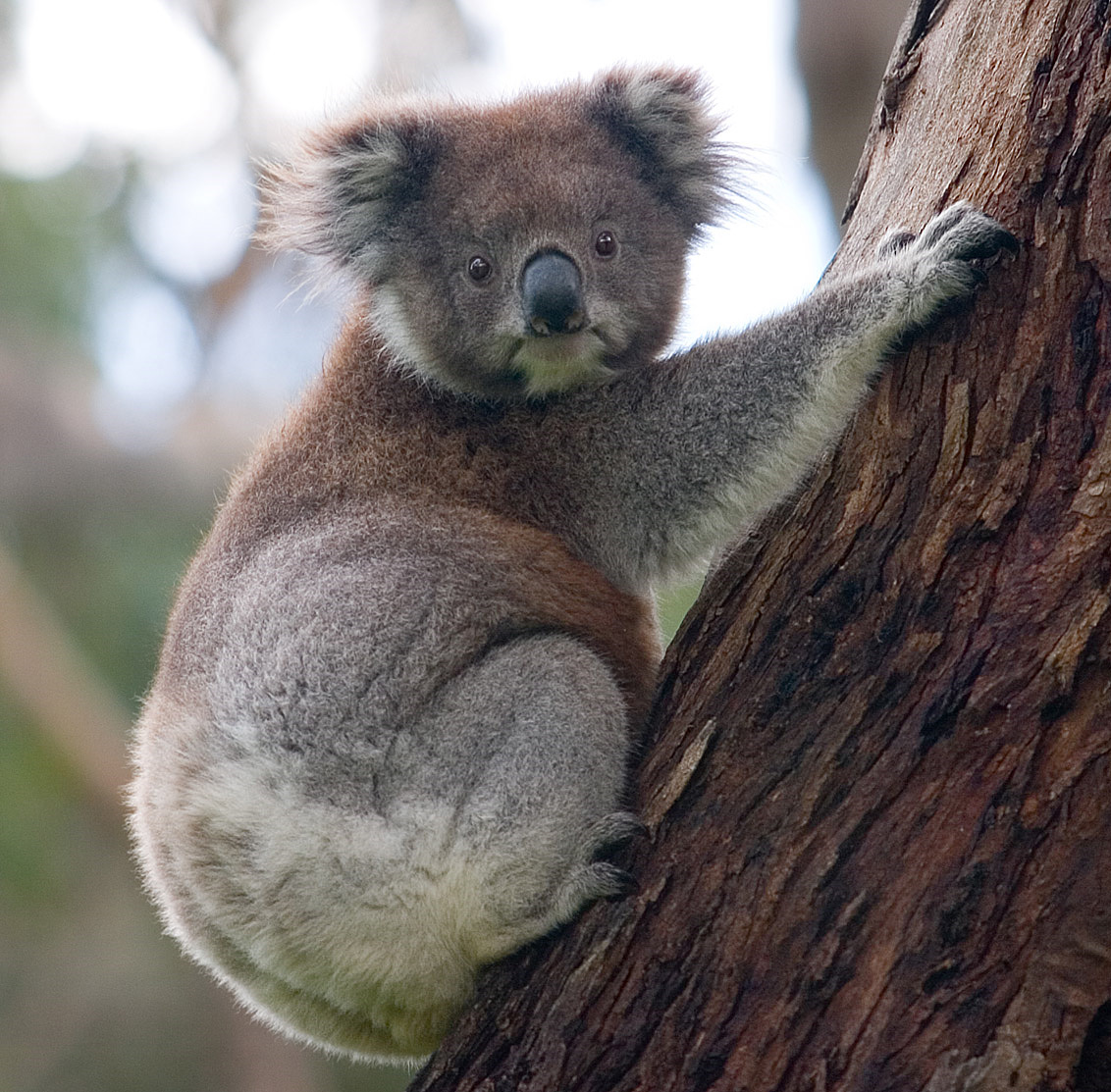
