= Rhesus lymphocryptovirus =

Virus classification
- (unranked): Virus
- Realm: Duplodnaviria
- Kingdom: Heunggongvirae
- Phylum: Peploviricota
- Class: Herviviricetes
- Order: Herpesvirales
- Family: Orthoherpesviridae
- Genus: Lymphocryptovirus
- Species: Lymphocryptovirus macacinegamma4

Synonyms
- Rhesus lymphocryptovirus; Cercopithecine herpesvirus 15; Macacine gammaherpesvirus 4; Rhesus HHV-4-like virus; Rhesus Epstein Barr virus; Rhesus EBV-like herpesvirus

Species of virus

Rhesus lymphocryptovirus (RLV) is a species of virus in the genus Lymphocryptovirus, subfamily Gammaherpesvirinae, family Orthoherpesviridae, and order Herpesvirales.

In nature, RLV infects rhesus macaques (Macaca mulatta).

== Comparison with Epstein-Barr virus ==
Its genetic structure has been fully sequenced and found to be highly homologous with that of Epstein-Barr virus (EBV), at 65%. The structural proteins are highly conserved, while genes expressed during EBV latent infection are much less well conserved. Even in cases where genes have low homology, the RLV infection genes are functionally interchangeable with EBV genes.

RLV infection in rhesus monkeys resembles EBV infection in humans in several respects:

- Oral transmission,
- Atypical lymphocytosis
- Lymphadenopathy
- Activation of CD23+ peripheral blood B cells
- Sustained serologic responses to lytic and latent Human gammaherpesvirus 4 antigens
- Latent infection in the peripheral blood
- Virus persistence in oropharyngeal secretions

These features make the rhesus lymphocryptovirus potentially useful for studying the pathogenesis, prevention, and treatment of EBV infection and associated oncogenesis.
