= Herpesvirus gorilla =

Virus classification
- (unranked): Virus
- Realm: Duplodnaviria
- Kingdom: Heunggongvirae
- Phylum: Peploviricota
- Class: Herviviricetes
- Order: Herpesvirales
- Family: Orthoherpesviridae
- Genus: Lymphocryptovirus
- Species: Lymphocryptovirus gorillinegamma1

Synonyms
- Gorilline gammaherpesvirus 1; Herpesvirus gorilla

Species of virus

Herpesvirus gorilla is a species of virus in the genus Lymphocryptovirus, subfamily Gammaherpesvirinae, family Orthoherpesviridae, and order Herpesvirales.

This species was the fifth to be described in its genus, among species that infect humans, baboons, chimpanzees, and orangutans. As its name implies, Herpesvirus gorilla infects gorillas.
