= Bovine herpesvirus 5 =

Virus classification
- (unranked): Virus
- Realm: Duplodnaviria
- Kingdom: Heunggongvirae
- Phylum: Peploviricota
- Class: Herviviricetes
- Order: Herpesvirales
- Family: Orthoherpesviridae
- Genus: Varicellovirus
- Species: Varicellovirus bovinealpha5

Synonyms
- Bovine alphaherpesvirus 5; Bovine herpesvirus 5

Species of virus

Bovine herpesvirus 5 (BoHV-5) is a species of virus of the genus Varicellovirus and subfamily Alphaherpesvirinae. It causes meningoencephalitis and respiratory disease in cattle and sheep. As with all herpes viruses latent infection can occur, with recrudescence at times of stressed and/or immunosuppression. Sites of latency include the CNS and mucosae of the nose and trachea. The disease has been documented in South America, the United States, Australia, Germany and Hungary.

Disease is most common in calves up to ten months of age.

== Clinical signs and diagnosis ==
Signs of respiratory disease include tachycardia and tachypnea with pyrexia, dyspnea, mucoid nasal discharge, hypersalivation and abnormal lung sounds. Systemic signs such as lethargy and anorexia are seen.

Neurological signs are normally acute. These signs include opisthotonus, hyperaesthesia, abnormal behaviour, ataxia, head pressing, blindness, proprioceptive deficits, coma and seizures. Sudden death occurs in neonates. Subacute disease almost always fatal, causing depression, anorexia, ataxia and a pronounced dyspnea.

Animals that recover from the infection or become infected following Bovine herpesvirus 1 infection become latent carriers.

To diagnose infection, the virus is identified using specific monoclonal antibodies, PCR or ELISA. Neurological lesions should be identifiable on postmortem examination.

== Treatment and control ==
There is currently no treatment or specific vaccine for Bovine herpesvirus 5, but Bovine herpesvirus 1 vaccines seem to provide some cross-protection.

== See also ==
- Bovine herpesvirus (disambiguation)
