= Orangutan herpesvirus =

Virus classification
- (unranked): Virus
- Realm: Duplodnaviria
- Kingdom: Heunggongvirae
- Phylum: Peploviricota
- Class: Herviviricetes
- Order: Herpesvirales
- Family: Orthoherpesviridae
- Genus: Lymphocryptovirus
- Species: Lymphocryptovirus ponginegamma2

Synonyms
- Orangutan herpesvirus; Pongine gammaherpesvirus 2; Pongine herpesvirus 2

Species of virus

Orangutan herpesvirus is a species of virus in the genus Lymphocryptovirus, subfamily Gammaherpesvirinae, family Orthoherpesviridae, and order Herpesvirales.

It infects orangutans (Pongo).
