= Bovine herpesvirus 4 =

Virus classification
- (unranked): Virus
- Realm: Duplodnaviria
- Kingdom: Heunggongvirae
- Phylum: Peploviricota
- Class: Herviviricetes
- Order: Herpesvirales
- Family: Orthoherpesviridae
- Genus: Rhadinovirus
- Species: Rhadinovirus bovinegamma4

Synonyms
- Bovine gammaherpesvirus 4; Bovine herpesvirus 4; Movar virus

Species of virus

Bovine herpesvirus 4 (BoHV-4) is a species of virus in the Orthoherpesviridae family. It is part of the subfamily Gammaherpesvirinae and genus Rhadinovirus. Infection is normally sub-clinical but can cause reproductive disease in cattle such as endometritis, vulvovaginitis and mastitis. Transmission is both vertical and horizontal. It can also be indirectly spread by fomites. Distribution is worldwide and the virus infects a range of ruminants, including bison, buffalo, sheep and goats.

The disease may be referred to as a passenger virus.

== Clinical signs and diagnosis ==
BoHV-4 infection is often subclinical, with no observable clinical signs. However the virus may cause abortion and retained foetal membranes, and if an infected fetus is born alive it may be weak. It can also cause mastitis in dairy cattle. It may be isolated from conjunctivitis and respiratory disease cases but it is unknown whether the EHV-4 is a primary or opportunistic pathogen in these cases.

Diagnosis is achieved by virus isolation (from tissues or secretions), PCR, ELISA, and indirect immunofluorescence. Because BHV-4 infection can be asymptomatic, the presence of the virus does not confirm that it was the cause of the observed clinical signs.

== Treatment and control ==
Treatment is symptomatic. The virus can remain latent in recovered animals - shedding at times of stress, allowing the spread of disease to others. Appropriate hygiene and isolation measures can control disease. Vaccines exist in the USA but are not widely used.

== See also ==
- Bovine herpesvirus (disambiguation)
