= Ovine herpesvirus 2 =

Virus classification
- (unranked): Virus
- Realm: Duplodnaviria
- Kingdom: Heunggongvirae
- Phylum: Peploviricota
- Class: Herviviricetes
- Order: Herpesvirales
- Family: Orthoherpesviridae
- Genus: Macavirus
- Species: Macavirus ovinegamma2

Synonyms
- Ovine gammaherpesvirus 2; Ovine herpesvirus 2

Species of virus

Ovine herpesvirus 2 (OvHV-2) is a species of virus in the genus Macavirus, subfamily Gammaherpesvirinae, family Orthoherpesviridae, and order Herpesvirales. It is carried asymptomatically by sheep, but in poorly-adapted hosts such as bison, cattle, and cervids, infection causes malignant catarral fever.

== Clinical signs ==
Infected bison, cattle, and cervids develop malignant catarrhal fever, which is characterized by lymphoproliferation and vasculitis. Clinical signs include fever, hypersalivation, ocular and nasal discharge, inflammation of the eye, swollen lymph nodes, dermatitis, neurological signs, arthritis, and inflammation and necrosis in alimentary, respiratory, and urinary tracts.

== Diagnosis ==
Viral DNA can be detected by PCR performed with blood, kidney, intestinal wall, lymph node, or brain tissue. Viral antigens can be identified in lesions using immunohistochemistry.

== Prevention ==
No commercial vaccine is currently available. Viral spread in sheep may be controlled by early weaning and isolation of lambs. Susceptible species should be housed at least 1km from sheep to prevent infection, since infection in these species is most frequently fatal.
