= Rodent herpesvirus Peru =

Virus classification
- (unranked): Virus
- Realm: Duplodnaviria
- Kingdom: Heunggongvirae
- Phylum: Peploviricota
- Class: Herviviricetes
- Order: Herpesvirales
- Family: Orthoherpesviridae
- Genus: Rhadinovirus
- Species: Rhadinovirus cricetidgamma2

Synonyms
- Cricetid gammaherpesvirus 2; Rodent herpesvirus Peru

Species of virus

Rodent herpesvirus Peru is a species of virus in the genus Rhadinovirus, subfamily Gammaherpesvirinae, family Orthoherpesviridae, and order Herpesvirales.
