= Herpesvirus pan =

Virus classification
- (unranked): Virus
- Realm: Duplodnaviria
- Kingdom: Heunggongvirae
- Phylum: Peploviricota
- Class: Herviviricetes
- Order: Herpesvirales
- Family: Orthoherpesviridae
- Genus: Lymphocryptovirus
- Species: Lymphocryptovirus paninegamma1

Synonyms
- Chimpanzee lymphocryptovirus; Herpesvirus pan; Panine gammaherpesvirus 1

Species of virus

Herpesvirus pan is a species of virus in the genus Lymphocryptovirus, subfamily Gammaherpesvirinae, family Orthoherpesviridae, and order Herpesvirales.

The virus infects chimpanzee (Pan troglodytes) leukocytes. The glycoprotein B (gB) gene of herpesvirus pan is virtually identical to the corresponding gene in the orangutan lymphocryptovirus. This suggests that the virus may have been transmitted between chimpanzees and orangutans relatively recently (either in the wild or in captivity).

It is 35 to 45% homologous to the human Epstein–Barr virus, which is classified in the same genus.
