= Wood mouse herpesvirus =

Virus classification
- (unranked): Virus
- Realm: Duplodnaviria
- Kingdom: Heunggongvirae
- Phylum: Peploviricota
- Class: Herviviricetes
- Order: Herpesvirales
- Family: Orthoherpesviridae
- Genus: Rhadinovirus
- Species: Rhadinovirus muridgamma7

Synonyms
- Murid gammaherpesvirus 7; Wood mouse herpesvirus

Species of virus

Wood mouse herpesvirus is a species of virus in the genus Rhadinovirus, subfamily Gammaherpesvirinae, family Orthoherpesviridae, and order Herpesvirales.
