= Mustelid herpesvirus 1 =

Virus classification
- (unranked): Virus
- Realm: Duplodnaviria
- Kingdom: Heunggongvirae
- Phylum: Peploviricota
- Class: Herviviricetes
- Order: Herpesvirales
- Family: Orthoherpesviridae
- Genus: Percavirus
- Species: Percavirus mustelidgamma1

Synonyms
- Mustelid gammaherpesvirus 1; Mustelid herpesvirus 1

Species of virus

Mustelid herpesvirus 1 (MusHV-1) is a species of virus in the genus Percavirus, subfamily Gammaherpesvirinae, family Orthoherpesviridae, and order Herpesvirales.
