= Phocid gammaherpesvirus 2 =

Virus classification
- (unranked): Virus
- Realm: Duplodnaviria
- Kingdom: Heunggongvirae
- Phylum: Peploviricota
- Class: Herviviricetes
- Order: Herpesvirales
- Family: Orthoherpesviridae
- Genus: incertae sedis
- Species: Phocid gammaherpesvirus 2

Species of virus

Phocid gammaherpesvirus 2 (PhHV-2) is a species of virus of uncertain generic placement in the subfamily Gammaherpesvirinae, family Herpesviridae, and order Herpesvirales.
