= Bovine herpesvirus 6 =

Virus classification
- (unranked): Virus
- Realm: Duplodnaviria
- Kingdom: Heunggongvirae
- Phylum: Peploviricota
- Class: Herviviricetes
- Order: Herpesvirales
- Family: Orthoherpesviridae
- Genus: Macavirus
- Species: Macavirus bovinegamma6

Synonyms
- Bovine gammaherpesvirus 6; Bovine herpesvirus 6

Species of virus

Bovine herpesvirus 6 (BoHV-6) is a species of virus in the genus Macavirus, subfamily Gammaherpesvirinae, family Orthoherpesviridae, and order Herpesvirales.
