= Harp seal herpesvirus =

Virus classification
- (unranked): Virus
- Realm: Duplodnaviria
- Kingdom: Heunggongvirae
- Phylum: Peploviricota
- Class: Herviviricetes
- Order: Herpesvirales
- Family: Orthoherpesviridae
- Genus: Percavirus
- Species: Percavirus phocidgamma3

Synonyms
- Harp seal herpesvirus; Phocid gammaherpesvirus 3

Species of virus

Harp seal herpesvirus is a species of virus in the family Orthoherpesviridae.
