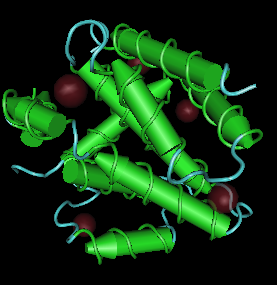
- 3D NIH Image of typical structure of Alcelaphine herpesvirus 2

Virus classification
- (unranked): Virus
- Realm: Duplodnaviria
- Kingdom: Heunggongvirae
- Phylum: Peploviricota
- Class: Herviviricetes
- Order: Herpesvirales
- Family: Orthoherpesviridae
- Genus: Macavirus
- Species: Macavirus alcelaphinegamma2

Synonyms
- Alcelaphine gammaherpesvirus 2; Alcelaphine herpesvirus 2

= Alcelaphine herpesvirus 2 =

Species of virus

Alcelaphine herpesvirus 2 (AlHV-2) is a species of Macavirus that is believed to be responsible for causing hartebeest infections of malignant catarrhal fever.

== Clinical definition ==
Distantly related to human herpes, a virus of this type is composed of a series of double strand sequences of up to 100 gene segments, aligned along a long chromosome surrounded by terminal DNA segments. The effect of the virus is to cause nasal discharge, a high fever, filmed over eyes, failures of the lymphatic system, inflammation of various mucous membranes, and occasionally necrosis of the upper digestive system. Very advanced cases show signs of decay of the nervous system. Occasionally, lesions, arthritis, and digestive problems such as diarrhea have been observed.

== Cause ==
The agent of MCF in hartebeests, it is related to other variants that strike down antelopes. It was isolated in 1960 and is believed to be carried as reservoirs by goats, sheep, and other domestic animals. There are variants that have affected deer, gnu, and other captive species in zoos around the world.

== Range ==
All species of African wildebeest and hartbeest can be infected or at least carry this virus. There is no direct evidence that other African wild variants like addax can be hosts, but research is ongoing. The alcelaphine antelope affecting form is primarily found in Africa, in the natural habitat of wildebeest, hartebeest, and topi. It has also occurred in zoos and wild animal parks that also kept wildebeest. The increasing popularity in North America of wild animal parks may spread its range further.

== Transmission, clinical effects, and morbidity ==
Alcelaphine herpesvirus 2 is primarily transmitted by nasal emissions, by contact with water, flood, feces, or close contact. It can be destroyed by prolonged exposure to sunlight, but has a very long incubation period and thus may have a long period of time to infect other animals. There are three forms usually seen. The first a nasal form with fever, nasal inflammation and digestive problems that is very mild and only lasts a few days. The second is a more severe form that involves fever, diarrhea, heavy nasal discharge, and lymph system failure, with a morbidity of 28 percent. The so-called "head and eye" form is the most lethal and serious form, which results in all known effects and central nervous system damage, predated by nervous shakes and eventually muscular failure. Morbidity in some cases is as high as 90 percent.

== Vaccination ==
As the primary infected strains of animals are wild and free range animals, vaccination programs have been largely ineffective.
