= MiR-27 =

Family of microRNA precursors found in animals

miR-27
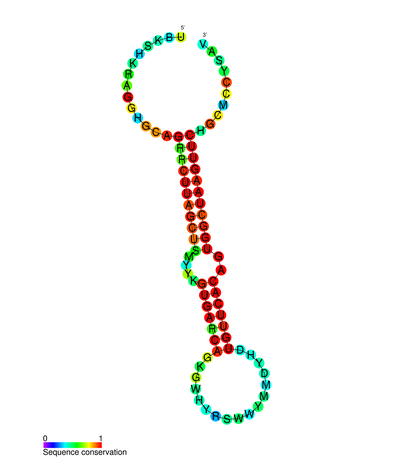
- Conserved secondary structure of miR-27 precursor

Identifiers
- Symbol: miR-27
- Rfam: RF00644
- miRBase: MI0000085
- miRBase family: MIPF0000036
- NCBI Gene: 407018
- HGNC: 31613

Other data
- RNA type: miRNA
- Domain: Animalia
- Locus: Chr. 19
- PDB structures: PDBe

miR-27 is a family of microRNA precursors found in animals, including humans. MicroRNAs are typically transcribed as ~70 nucleotide precursors and subsequently processed by the Dicer enzyme to give a ~22 nucleotide product. The excised region or, mature product, of the miR-27 precursor is the microRNA mir-27.

Herpesvirus saimiri expresses several non-coding RNAs (HSURs) which have been found to significantly reduce the level of mir-27 in a host cell. It has been proposed that miR-27 operates together with miR-23 and mir-24 in a co-operative cluster.

== Regulation of adipocyte differentiation ==
miR-27 is one of a number of microRNAs implicated in cholesterol homeostasis and fatty acid metabolism. The miR-27 gene family has been shown to be downregulated during the differentiation of adipocytes. miR-27 inhibits adipocyte formation when overexpressed, acting by blocking the expression of two main regulators of adipogenesis. MicroRNAs miR-27a and -27b have been found to negatively regulate adipocyte differentiation through regulation of the peroxisome proliferator-activated receptor gamma (PPARγ) post-transcriptionally, as well as C/EBP alpha in the case of miR-27b. miR-27 can be identified both as an adipogenic inhibitor and as playing an important role in the development of obesity.

== Wnt signalling pathway ==
miR-27 is an activator of the Wnt signalling pathway, affecting the differentiation of mesenchymal stem cells into osteoblasts. miR-27 has been found to target and inhibit gene expression of the adenomatous polyposis coli (APC) protein, enabling it to regulate osteoblast differentiation. Expression levels of miR-27 are positively correlated with beta-catenin, a key protein in Wnt signalling. There is activation of Wnt signalling through nuclear accumulation of this protein, which is in response to inhibition of the beta-catenin destruction complex. This in turn is brought about by APC inhibition of miR-27.

== Cancer Regulation ==
miR-27 is known to regulate components involved in numerous types of cancer, including breast and ovarian. miR-27a has been identified as an oncogenic microRNA and, specifically, is highly expressed in breast cancer cells. mir-27b expression is associated with survival in triple negative breast cancer patients. Inhibition of miR-27 by antisense molecules decreases cell proliferation. Antisense RNA directed against miR-27a has been shown to decrease the percentage of cells in S phase whilst also increasing those in the G2-M phase.

The FOXO (Forkhead Box O) gene sub-family encodes tumour-suppressive transcription factors that regulate multiple aspects of cell cycle progression and survival. FOXO1 protein expression is down-regulated in breast tumour tissue samples; miR-27a has been identified as one of three miRNAS (along with miR-96 and miR-182) which directly target FOXO1 and regulate its endogenous expression. Suppression of miR-27a results in a FOXO1 protein increase and a consequent cell number decrease.
