= Macacine herpesvirus 8 =

Virus classification
- (unranked): Virus
- Realm: Duplodnaviria
- Kingdom: Heunggongvirae
- Phylum: Peploviricota
- Class: Herviviricetes
- Order: Herpesvirales
- Family: Orthoherpesviridae
- Genus: Rhadinovirus
- Species: Rhadinovirus macacinegamma8

Synonyms
- Macacine gammaherpesvirus 8; Macacine herpesvirus 8

Species of virus

Macacine herpesvirus 8 (McHV-8) is a species of virus in the family Orthoherpesviridae.
