= Cynomolgus macaque lymphocryptovirus =

Virus classification
- (unranked): Virus
- Realm: Duplodnaviria
- Kingdom: Heunggongvirae
- Phylum: Peploviricota
- Class: Herviviricetes
- Order: Herpesvirales
- Family: Orthoherpesviridae
- Genus: Lymphocryptovirus
- Species: Lymphocryptovirus macacinegamma10

Synonyms
- Cynomolgus macaque lymphocryptovirus; Macacine gammaherpesvirus 10

Species of virus

Cynomolgus macaque lymphocryptovirus is a species of virus in the family Orthoherpesviridae.
