= BHV =

BHV may refer to:

- Black Heart Village, a Hip-Hop collective from Baton Rouge, Louisiana, formed in 2017
- Brussels-Halle-Vilvoorde, a former Belgian electoral and judicial district
- Bazar de l'Hôtel de Ville, a department store in Paris, France
- Bovine herpesvirus (disambiguation), a group of viruses
- Bahawalpur Airport
