= Japanese macaque rhadinovirus =

Virus classification
- (unranked): Virus
- Realm: Duplodnaviria
- Kingdom: Heunggongvirae
- Phylum: Peploviricota
- Class: Herviviricetes
- Order: Herpesvirales
- Family: Orthoherpesviridae
- Genus: Rhadinovirus
- Species: Rhadinovirus macacinegamma11

Synonyms
- Japanese macaque rhadinovirus; Macacine gammaherpesvirus 11

Species of virus

Japanese macaque rhadinovirus is a species of virus in the family Orthoherpesviridae.
