= Murid gammaherpesvirus 68 =

Virus classification
- (unranked): Virus
- Realm: Duplodnaviria
- Kingdom: Heunggongvirae
- Phylum: Peploviricota
- Class: Herviviricetes
- Order: Herpesvirales
- Family: Orthoherpesviridae
- Genus: Rhadinovirus
- Species: Rhadinovirus muridgamma4
- Virus: Murid gammaherpesvirus 68

Virus isolate

Murid gammaherpesvirus 68 (MuHV-68) is an isolate of the virus species Murid gammaherpesvirus 4, a member of the genus Rhadinovirus. It is a member of the subfamily Gammaherpesvirinae in the family of Herpesviridae. MuHV-68 serves as a model for study of human gammaherpesviruses which cause significant human disease including B-cell lymphoma and Kaposi's sarcoma. The WUMS strain of MuHV-68 was fully sequenced and annotated in 1997, and the necessity of most of its genes in viral replication was characterized by random transposon mutagenesis.

== Surface proteins ==
Alpha-, beta-, and gammaherpesviruses display a heterodimer composed of glycoprotein H (gH) and glycoprotein L (gL) on their envelopes. This receptor is involved in the cell-to-cell transmission of the virus. Glycoprotein H has two conformations. Glycoprotein L is a chaperone protein which assures that gH takes on the correct conformation. Murid gammaherpesvirus 68 lack gL, gH misfolds. When alpha- or betaherpesviruses lack gL, they are noninfectious. Murid gammaherpesvirus 68 lacks gL, it remains infectious but is less able to bind to fibroblasts and epithelial cells.

The open reading frame M7 of the MuHV-68 genome encodes for the surface receptor glycoprotein 150 (gp150). It is homologous to the Epstein-Barr virus membrane antigen gp350/220. MuHV-68 is more closely related to the Kaposi's sarcoma-associated herpesvirus (KSHV) than it is to the Epstein-Barr virus. Glycoprotein K8.1 is the KSHV homolog of MuHV-68 gp150. MuHV-68 is a very close relative of MuHV-72. The MuHV-68 M7 gene differs from the corresponding MuHV-72 gene by five point mutations which alter four codons. Glycoprotein 150 allows MuHV-68 to bind to B-cells.
