= Manticavirus =

Virus classification
- (unranked): Virus
- Realm: Duplodnaviria
- Kingdom: Heunggongvirae
- Phylum: Peploviricota
- Class: Herviviricetes
- Order: Herpesvirales
- Family: Orthoherpesviridae
- Subfamily: Gammaherpesvirinae
- Genus: Manticavirus

Species
- See text

Genus of viruses

Manticavirus is a genus of viruses in the subfamily Gammaherpesvirinae, in the family Orthoherpesviridae, in the order Herpesvirales. This genus was the only genus to consist entirely of marsupial-hosted species as of the time of naming, hence the name component Mantica (Latin: knapsack), in reference to the marsupial pouch.

== Species ==
The genus contains the following species, listed by scientific name and followed by the common name of the species:

- Manticavirus phascolarctidgamma1, Phascolarctid herpesvirus 1
- Manticavirus vombatidgamma1, Vombatid herpesvirus 1
