= Agua Preta virus =

Virus classification
- (unranked): Virus
- Realm: Duplodnaviria
- Kingdom: Heunggongvirae
- Phylum: Peploviricota
- Class: Herviviricetes
- Order: Herpesvirales
- Family: Orthoherpesviridae
- Genus: incertae sedis
- Virus: Agua Preta virus

Species of virus

Agua Preta virus is an unaccepted species of virus, suggested to belong to the order Herpesvirales and family Orthoherpesviridae, as determined by thin-section electron microscopy. It was isolated from the gray short-tailed bat, Carollia subrufa, in the Utinga Forest near Belém, Brazil.
