= Acciptrid herpesvirus 1 =

Virus classification
- (unranked): Virus
- Realm: Duplodnaviria
- Kingdom: Heunggongvirae
- Phylum: Peploviricota
- Class: Herviviricetes
- Order: Herpesvirales
- Family: Orthoherpesviridae
- Genus: incertae sedis
- Virus: Acciptrid herpesvirus 1

Synonyms
- Bald eagle herpesvirus

Possible species of virus

Acciptrid herpesvirus 1 (AcHV-1) is an unaccepted species of virus suggested to belong to the order Herpesvirales and family Herpesviridae. It was isolated from a bald eagle (Haliaeetus leucocephalus).
