= Iguanid herpesvirus 2 =

Virus classification
- (unranked): Virus
- Realm: Duplodnaviria
- Kingdom: Heunggongvirae
- Phylum: Peploviricota
- Class: Herviviricetes
- Order: Herpesvirales
- Family: Orthoherpesviridae
- Genus: incertae sedis
- Species: Iguanid herpesvirus 2

Species of virus

Iguanid herpesvirus 2 (IgHV-2) is a species of virus of uncertain generic and subfamilial placement in the family Herpesviridae and order Herpesvirales.
