= Bossavirus =

Virus classification
- (unranked): Virus
- Realm: Duplodnaviria
- Kingdom: Heunggongvirae
- Phylum: Peploviricota
- Class: Herviviricetes
- Order: Herpesvirales
- Family: Orthoherpesviridae
- Genus: Bossavirus
- Species: Bossavirus delphinidgamma1

Genus of viruses

Bossavirus is a genus of viruses in the subfamily Gammaherpesvirinae, in the family Orthoherpesviridae, in the order Herpesvirales. It contains the sole species Common bottlenose dolphin gammaherpesvirus 1 (Bossavirus delphinidgamma1).
