= Patagivirus =

Virus classification
- (unranked): Virus
- Realm: Duplodnaviria
- Kingdom: Heunggongvirae
- Phylum: Peploviricota
- Class: Herviviricetes
- Order: Herpesvirales
- Family: Orthoherpesviridae
- Genus: Patagivirus
- Species: Patagivirus vespertilionidgamma3

Synonyms
- Eptesicus fuscus gammaherpesvirus; Vespertilionid gammaherpesvirus 3

Genus of viruses

Patagivirus is a genus of viruses in the subfamily Gammaherpesvirinae, in the family Orthoherpesviridae, in the order Herpesvirales. It contains the sole species Eptesicus fuscus gammaherpesvirus.
