= Percavirus =

Virus classification
- (unranked): Virus
- Realm: Duplodnaviria
- Kingdom: Heunggongvirae
- Phylum: Peploviricota
- Class: Herviviricetes
- Order: Herpesvirales
- Family: Orthoherpesviridae
- Subfamily: Gammaherpesvirinae
- Genus: Percavirus

Species
- See text

Genus of viruses

Percavirus is a genus of viruses in the order Herpesvirales, in the family Orthoherpesviridae, in the subfamily Gammaherpesvirinae. Mammals serve as natural hosts. Diseases associated with this genus include: conjunctivitis, immunosuppression in foals, pneumonia, respiratory disease.

== Species ==
The genus contains the following species, listed by scientific name and followed by the common name of the species:

- Percavirus equidgamma2, Equine herpesvirus 2
- Percavirus equidgamma5, Equine herpesvirus 5
- Percavirus felidgamma1, Felis catus gammaherpesvirus 1
- Percavirus mustelidgamma1, Mustelid herpesvirus 1
- Percavirus phocidgamma3, Harp seal herpesvirus
- Percavirus rhinolophidgamma1, Rhinolophus gammaherpesvirus 1
- Percavirus vespertilionidgamma1, Bat gammaherpesvirus 8

== Structure ==
Viruses in Percavirus are enveloped, with icosahedral, spherical to pleomorphic, and round geometries, and T=16 symmetry. The diameter is around 150-200 nm. Genomes are linear and non-segmented, around 180kb in length.

Genus	Structure	Symmetry	Capsid	Genomic arrangement	Genomic segmentation
Percavirus	Spherical pleomorphic	T=16	Enveloped	Linear	Monopartite

== Life cycle ==
Viral replication is nuclear, and is lysogenic. Entry into the host cell is achieved by attachment of the viral glycoproteins to host receptors, which mediates endocytosis. Replication follows the dsDNA bidirectional replication model. DNA-templated transcription, with some alternative splicing mechanism is the method of transcription. The virus exits the host cell by nuclear egress, and budding. Mammals serve as the natural host.

Genus	Host details	Tissue tropism	Entry details	Release details	Replication site	Assembly site	Transmission
Percavirus	Mammals	B-lymphocytes	Glycoprotiens	Budding	Nucleus	Nucleus	Sex; saliva
