= HSUR =

HSUR1
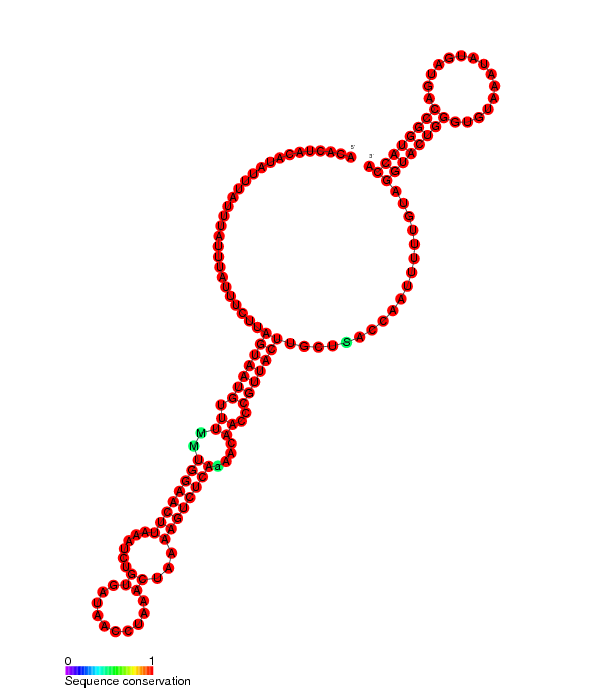
- Conserved secondary structure of HSUR1.

Identifiers
- Symbol: HSUR1
- Rfam: RF01802

Other data
- RNA type: snRNA
- Domain(s): Herpesvirus saimiri, Herpesvirus ateles
- PDB structures: PDBe

HSUR2
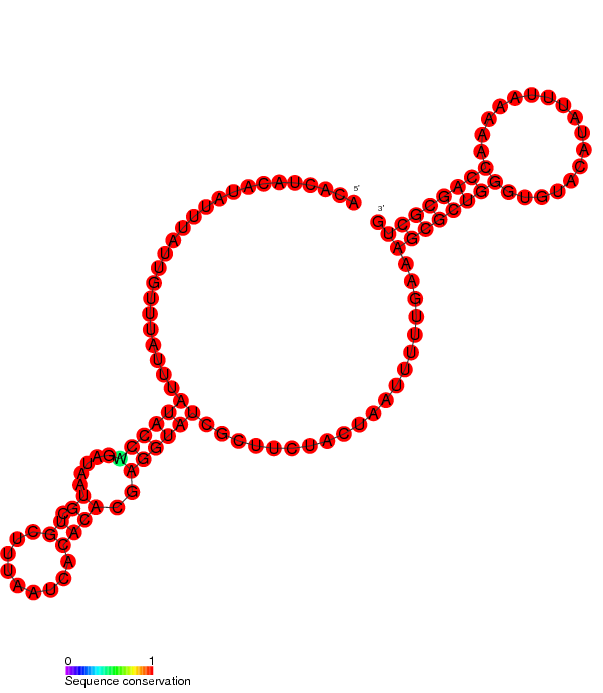
- Conserved secondary structure of HSUR2.

Identifiers
- Symbol: HSUR2
- Rfam: RF01802

Other data
- RNA type: snRNA
- Domain(s): Herpesvirus saimiri, Herpesvirus ateles
- PDB structures: PDBe

HSURs (Herpesvirus saimiri U RNAs) are viral small regulatory RNAs. They are found in Herpesvirus saimiri which is responsible for aggressive T-cell leukemias in primates. They are nuclear RNAs which bind host proteins to form small nuclear ribonucleoproteins (snRNPs). The RNAs are 114–143 nucleotides in length and the HSUR family has been subdivided into HSURs numbered 1 to 7. The function of HSURs has not yet been identified; they do not affect transcription so are thought to act post-transcriptionally, potentially influencing the stability of host mRNAs.

HSUR1 and 2 are the most conserved members of the family within HSV subgroups. HSUR1 has been shown to bind the host heterogeneous ribonucleoprotein particle protein hnRNPD in vivo. Other HSURs bind HuR/ELAVL1. They are transcribed by RNA polymerase II with promoters similar to that of U RNAs

Features shared by all HSURs include:

- 5′-trimethylguanosine caps
- 3′ terminal stem-loops
- canonical Sm protein-binding site (AUUUUUG)

A proposed role for HSURs is that they use the RNA interference (RNAi) pathway to manipulate host-cell gene expression. One identified miRNA which responds to HSURs is miR-27.

== See also ==
- HHV Latency Associated Transcript
