= Macavirus =

Virus classification
- (unranked): Virus
- Realm: Duplodnaviria
- Kingdom: Heunggongvirae
- Phylum: Peploviricota
- Class: Herviviricetes
- Order: Herpesvirales
- Family: Orthoherpesviridae
- Subfamily: Gammaherpesvirinae
- Genus: Macavirus

Species
- See text

Genus of viruses

Macavirus is a genus of viruses in the order Herpesvirales, in the family Orthoherpesviridae, in the subfamily Gammaherpesvirinae. Mammals serve as natural hosts. There are nine species in this genus. Diseases associated with this genus include: inapparent infection in their reservoir hosts (wildebeest for alHV-1 and sheep for ovHV-2), but fatal lymphoproliferative disease when they infect MCF-susceptible hosts, including cattle, deer, bison, water buffalo and pigs.

== Species ==
The genus contains the following species, listed by scientific name and followed by the common name of the species:

- Macavirus alcelaphinegamma1, Alcelaphine herpesvirus 1
- Macavirus alcelaphinegamma2, Alcelaphine herpesvirus 2
- Macavirus bovinegamma6, Bovine herpesvirus 6
- Macavirus caprinegamma2, Caprine herpesvirus 2
- Macavirus hippotraginegamma1, Hippotragine herpesvirus 1
- Macavirus ovinegamma2, Ovine herpesvirus 2
- Macavirus suidgamma3, Porcine lymphotropic herpesvirus 1
- Macavirus suidgamma4, Porcine lymphotropic herpesvirus 2
- Macavirus suidgamma5, Porcine lymphotropic herpesvirus 3

== Structure ==
Viruses in Macavirus are enveloped, with icosahedral, spherical to pleomorphic, and Round geometries, and T=16 symmetry. The diameter is around 150-200 nm. Genomes are linear and non-segmented, around 180kb in length.

Genus	Structure	Symmetry	Capsid	Genomic arrangement	Genomic segmentation
Macavirus	Spherical pleomorphic	T=16	Enveloped	Linear	Monopartite

== Life cycle ==
Viral replication is nuclear, and is lysogenic. Entry into the host cell is achieved by attachment of the viral glycoproteins to host receptors, which mediates endocytosis. Replication follows the dsDNA bidirectional replication model. Dna templated transcription, with some alternative splicing mechanism is the method of transcription. The virus exits the host cell by nuclear egress, and budding. Mammals serve as the natural host.

Genus	Host details	Tissue tropism	Entry details	Release details	Replication site	Assembly site	Transmission
Macavirus	Mammals	B-lymphocytes	Glycoprotiens	Budding	Nucleus	Nucleus	Sex; saliva
