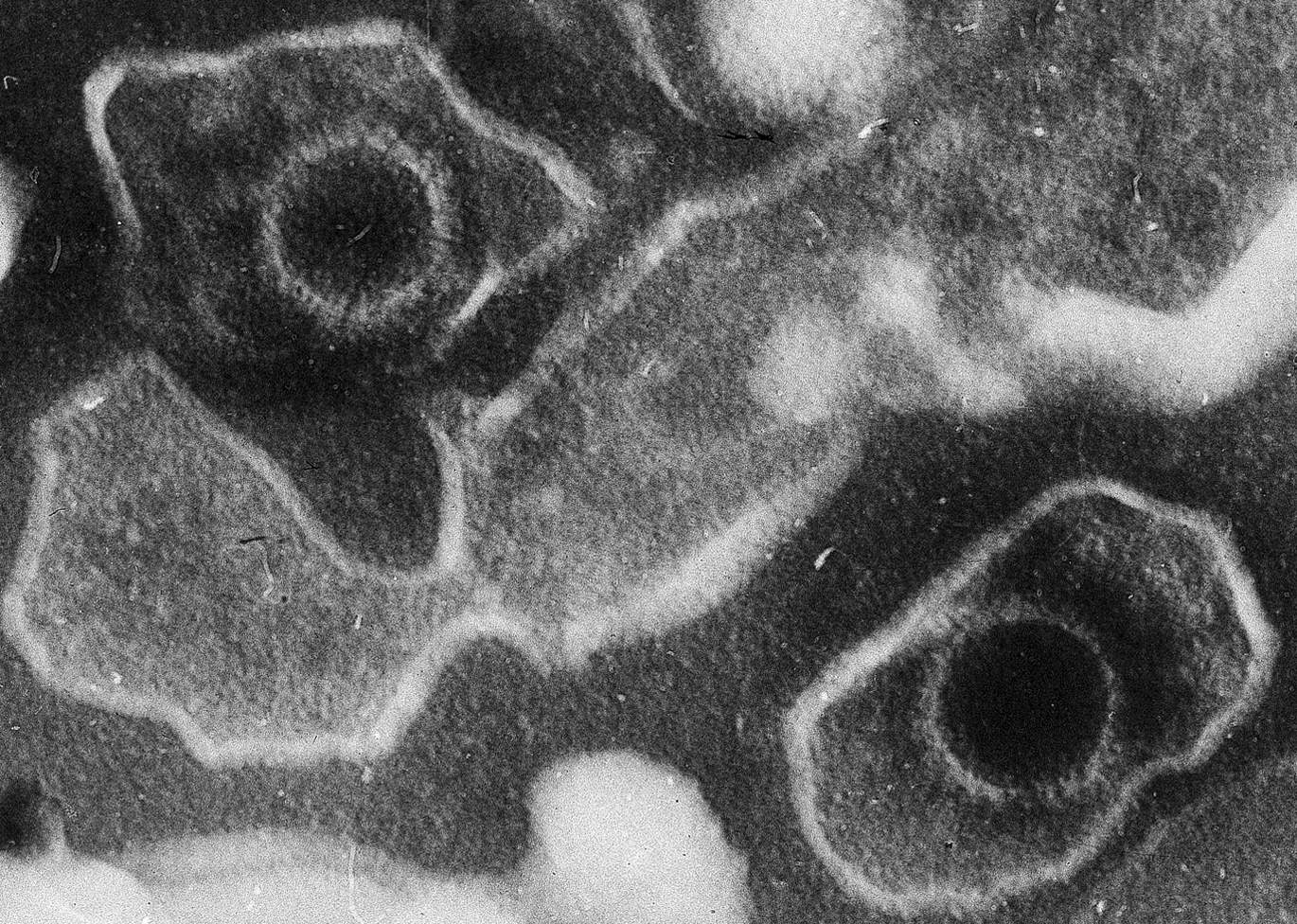
- Electron micrograph of two Epstein–Barr virus virions (viral particles) showing round capsids loosely surrounded by the membrane envelope

Virus classification
- (unranked): Virus
- Realm: Duplodnaviria
- Kingdom: Heunggongvirae
- Phylum: Peploviricota
- Class: Herviviricetes
- Order: Herpesvirales
- Family: Orthoherpesviridae
- Subfamily: Gammaherpesvirinae
- Genus: Lymphocryptovirus

Species
- See text

Synonyms
- Unnamed genus 3; Gamma-1 herpesviruses

= Lymphocryptovirus =

Genus of viruses

Lymphocryptovirus is a genus of viruses in the order Herpesvirales, in the family Orthoherpesviridae, in the subfamily Gammaherpesvirinae. This genus includes the human-infecting Epstein–Barr virus, as well as viruses that infect both Old World monkeys and New World monkeys. Other names for the Lymphocryptovirus genus include Lymphocryptoviridae (suffix -viridae implying family rank, although this is not the accepted taxonomy) and gamma-1 herpesviruses. There are nine species in this genus. Diseases associated with this genus include: mononucleosis, Burkitt's lymphoma, and nasopharyngeal carcinoma.

== Species ==
The genus contains the following species, listed by scientific name and followed by the common name of the species:

- Lymphocryptovirus callitrichinegamma3, Callitrichine herpesvirus 3
- Lymphocryptovirus gorillinegamma1, Herpesvirus gorilla
- Lymphocryptovirus humangamma4, Epstein–Barr virus
- Lymphocryptovirus macacinegamma4, Rhesus lymphocryptovirus
- Lymphocryptovirus macacinegamma10, Cynomolgus macaque lymphocryptovirus
- Lymphocryptovirus macacinegamma13, Macaca arctoides gammaherpesvirus 1
- Lymphocryptovirus paninegamma1, Herpesvirus pan
- Lymphocryptovirus papiinegamma1, Herpesvirus papio
- Lymphocryptovirus ponginegamma2, Orangutan herpesvirus

== Structure ==
Viruses in Lymphocryptovirus are enveloped, with icosahedral, spherical to pleomorphic, and round geometries, and T=16 symmetry. The diameter is around 150-200 nm. Genomes are linear and non-segmented, around 180kb in length.

Genus	Structure	Symmetry	Capsid	Genomic arrangement	Genomic segmentation
Lymphocryptovirus	Spherical pleomorphic	T=16	Enveloped	Linear	Monopartite

== Life cycle ==
Viral replication is nuclear, and is lysogenic. Entry into the host cell is achieved by attachment of the viral glycoproteins to host receptors, which mediates endocytosis. Replication follows the dsDNA bidirectional replication model. DNA-templated transcription, with some alternative splicing mechanism is the method of transcription. The virus exits the host cell by nuclear egress, and budding. Human and mammals serve as the natural host. Transmission routes are zoonosis, bite, contact, and saliva.

Genus	Host details	Tissue tropism	Entry details	Release details	Replication site	Assembly site	Transmission
Lymphocryptovirus	Humans; mammals	B-lymphocytes	Glycoprotiens	Budding	Nucleus	Nucleus	Saliva
