= Mollaret's meningitis =

- Other names: Benign recurrent lymphocytic meningitis
- Meninges of the central nervous system: dura mater, arachnoid, and pia mater.
- Specialty: Neurology

Mollaret's meningitis is a recurrent or chronic inflammation of the protective membranes covering the brain and spinal cord, known collectively as the meninges. Since Mollaret's meningitis is a recurrent, benign (non-cancerous), aseptic meningitis, it is also referred to as benign recurrent lymphocytic meningitis. It was named for Pierre Mollaret, the French neurologist who first described it in 1944.

Although chronic meningitis has been defined as "irritation and inflammation of the meninges persisting for more than 4 weeks being associated with pleocytosis in the cerebrospinal fluid", cerebrospinal fluid abnormalities may not be detectable for the entire time. Diagnosis can be elusive, as Helbok et al. note: "in reality, many more weeks, even months pass by until the diagnosis is established. In many cases the signs and symptoms of chronic meningitis not only persist for periods longer than 4 weeks, they even progress with continuing deterioration, i. e. headache, neck stiffness and even low grade fever. Impairment of consciousness, epileptic seizures, neurological signs and symptoms may evolve over time."

== Signs and symptoms ==
Mollaret's meningitis is characterized by chronic, recurrent episodes of headache, stiff neck, meningismus, and fever; cerebrospinal fluid (CSF) pleocytosis with large "endothelial" cells, neutrophil granulocytes, and lymphocytes; and attacks separated by symptom-free periods of weeks to years; and spontaneous remission of symptoms and signs. Many people have side effects between bouts that vary from chronic daily headaches to after-effects from meningitis such as hearing loss and visual impairment, nerve pain and twitches. Symptoms may be mild or severe. Some cases may be short, lasting only 3–7 days, while others last for weeks to months.

While herpes simplex and varicella can cause rash, Mollaret's patients may or may not have a rash. Herpes simplex virus is likely the most common cause of Mollaret's meningitis.

== Cause ==
Although for a long time, the cause of Mollaret's meningitis was not known, recent work has associated this problem with herpes simplex viruses, particularly HSV-2.

Cases of Mollaret's resulting from varicella zoster virus infection, diagnosed by polymerase chain reaction (PCR), have been documented. In these cases, PCR for herpes simplex was negative. Some patients also report frequent shingles outbreaks. Varicella zoster virus, which causes chickenpox and shingles is part of the herpes family, and is sometimes called "herpes zoster virus". CNS epidermoid cysts (a type of cholesteatoma) can give rise to Mollaret's meningitis especially with surgical manipulation of cyst contents.

A familial association, where more than one family member had Mollaret's, has been documented.

== Diagnosis ==
Diagnosis starts by examining the patient's symptoms. Symptoms can vary. Symptoms can include headache, sensitivity to light, neck stiffness, nausea, and vomiting. In some patients, fever is absent. Neurological examination and MRI can be normal.

Mollaret's meningitis is suspected based on symptoms, and can be confirmed by HSV 1 or HSV 2 on PCR of Cerebrospinal fluid (CSF), although not all cases test positive on PCR. PCR is performed on spinal fluid or blood, however, the viruses do not need to enter the spinal fluid or blood to spread within the body: they can spread by moving through the axons and dendrites of the nerves.

During the first 24 h of the disease the spinal fluid will show predominant polymorphonuclear neutrophils and large cells that have been called endothelial (Mollaret's) cells.

A study performed on patients who had diffuse symptoms, such as persistent or intermittent headaches, concluded that although PCR is a highly sensitive method for detection, it may not always be sensitive enough for identification of viral DNA in CSF, due to the fact that viral shedding from latent infection may be very low. The concentration of viruses in CSF during subclinical infection might be very low.

Investigations include blood tests (electrolytes, liver and kidney function, inflammatory markers and a complete blood count) and usually X-ray examination of the chest. The most important test in identifying or ruling out meningitis is analysis of the cerebrospinal fluid (fluid that envelops the brain and the spinal cord) through lumbar puncture (LP). However, if the patient is at risk for a cerebral mass lesion or elevated intracranial pressure (recent head injury, a known immune system problem, localizing neurological signs, or evidence on examination of a raised ICP), a lumbar puncture may be contraindicated because of the possibility of fatal brain herniation. In such cases, a CT or MRI scan is generally performed prior to the lumbar puncture to exclude this possibility. Otherwise, the CT or MRI should be performed after the LP, with MRI preferred over CT due to its superiority in demonstrating areas of cerebral edema, ischemia, and meningeal inflammation.

During the lumbar puncture procedure, the opening pressure is measured. A pressure of over 180 mm H_{2}O is suggestive of bacterial meningitis.

It is likely that Mollaret meningitis is underrecognized by physicians, and improved recognition may limit unwarranted antibiotic use and shorten or eliminate unnecessary hospital admission.

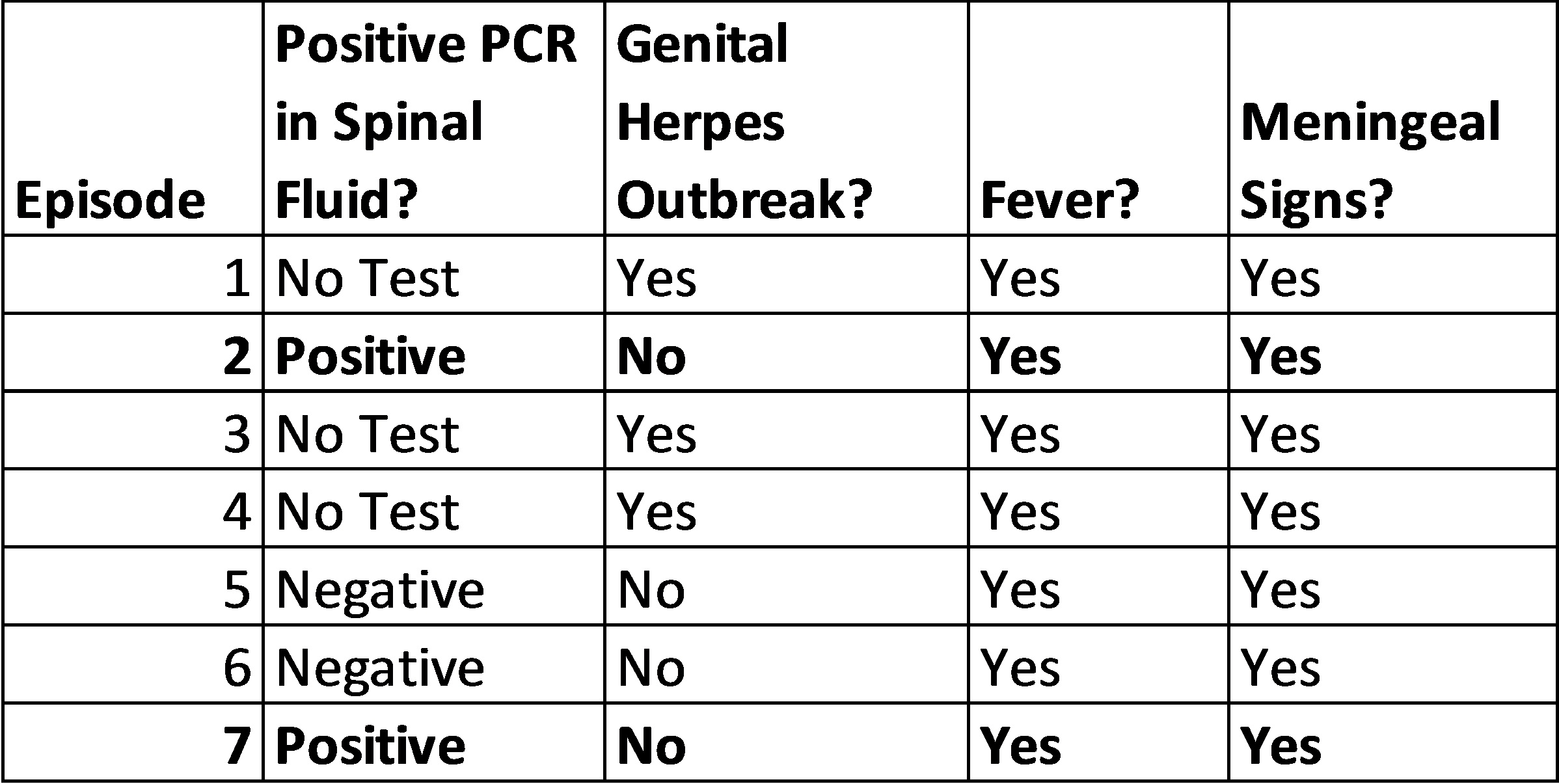
This shows the results of polymerase chain reaction tests on a chronic Mollaret's meningitis patient, along with symptoms.

PCR testing has advanced the state of the art in research, but PCR can be negative in individuals with Mollaret's, even during episodes with severe symptoms. For example, Kojima et al. published a case study for an individual who was hospitalized repeatedly, and who had clinical symptoms including genital herpes lesions. However, the patient was sometimes negative for HSV-2 by PCR, even though his meningitis symptoms were severe. Treatment with acyclovir was successful, indicating that a herpes virus was the cause of his symptoms.

== Treatment ==
Acyclovir is the treatment of choice for Mollaret's meningitis. Some patients see a drastic difference in how often they get sick and others don't. Often treatment means managing symptoms, such as pain management and strengthening the immune system.

The IHMF recommends that patients with benign recurrent lymphocytic meningitis receive intravenous acyclovir in the amount of 10 mg/kg every 8 hours, for 14–21 days. More recently, the second-generation antiherpetic drugs valacyclovir and famciclovir have been used to successfully treat patients with Mollaret's. Additionally, it has been reported that Indomethacin administered in the amount of 25 mg 3 times per day after meals, or 50 mg every 4 hours, has resulted in a faster recovery for patients, as well as more extended symptom-free intervals, between episodes.

== Prognosis ==
Recurring Mollaret meningitis attacks generally resolve within 3 to 5 years after the first occurrence, but some patients live with the disease for much longer. With suppressive antiviral therapy, some patients who have Mollaret's report experiencing fewer attacks. However, there are some that have flare ups all throughout the year.

== See also ==
- Encephalitis
- Meningitis
- Herpes simplex virus
- Varicella zoster virus
