= Bovine herpesvirus 1 =

Virus classification
- (unranked): Virus
- Realm: Duplodnaviria
- Kingdom: Heunggongvirae
- Phylum: Peploviricota
- Class: Herviviricetes
- Order: Herpesvirales
- Family: Orthoherpesviridae
- Genus: Varicellovirus
- Species: Varicellovirus bovinealpha1

Synonyms
- Bovine alphaherpesvirus 1; Bovine herpesvirus 1

Species of virus

Bovine herpesvirus 1 (BoHV-1) is a virus of the family Orthoherpesviridae and the subfamily Alphaherpesvirinae, known to cause several diseases worldwide in cattle, including rhinotracheitis, vaginitis, balanoposthitis, abortion, conjunctivitis, and enteritis. BoHV-1 is also a contributing factor in shipping fever, also known as bovine respiratory disease (BRD). It is spread horizontally through sexual contact, artificial insemination, and aerosol transmission and it may also be transmitted vertically across the placenta. BoHV-1 can cause both clinical and subclinical infections, depending on the virulence of the strain. Although these symptoms are mainly non-life-threatening it is an economically important disease as infection may cause a drop in production and affect trade restrictions. Like other herpesviruses, BoHV-1 causes a lifelong latent infection and sporadic shedding of the virus. The sciatic nerve and trigeminal nerve are the sites of latency. A reactivated latent carrier is normally the source of infection in a herd. The clinical signs displayed are dependent on the virulence of the strain. There is a vaccine available which reduces the severity and incidence of disease. Some countries in Europe have successfully eradicated the disease by applying a strict culling policy.

Infection can occur in cattle of any age, but it is most commonly seen between the ages of 6 and 18 months.

== Transmission ==
BoHV-1 enters the animal through the mucous membrane in the respiratory tract or genital tracts. The main mode of disease transmission is direct nose-to-nose contact between an infected and a susceptible animal. This is made possible because of the virus sloughing off into the mucus. Aerosols have to be exhaled, sneezed, or coughed from an infected animal during viral shedding in order for transmission to occur. Transmission also originates from contaminated semen through use of live breeding or AI; bulls that have been affected genitally may shed the virus in their semen.

Once infected it is hard for the animal to get rid of BoHV-1 because it has many mechanisms to evade the hosts’ immune systems involved in both innate immunity and adaptive immunity. The virus degrades interferon regulatory factor 3 (IRF3), effectively halting transcription of interferon type 1. Interferons are a component of innate immunity involved in inhibiting viral replication in a host cell, as well as activating immune cells. BoHV-1 is also able to evade adaptive immune cells by inducing apoptosis in CD4+ cells, which assist in activating T cells when antigens are present. This down regulates the number of immune cells that recognize the virus, allowing the virus to evade detection and elimination. The virus has many other evasion strategies against the host's immune system contributing to the virus being able to maintain lifelong infection in the animal.

After primary infection of BoHV-1, the latent infection is quite often found in the trigeminal ganglion of the cow, although on occasion infection can enter the central nervous system. These latent infections can possibly reactivate, with or without clinical symptoms, under conditions of stress or by experimental methods. Infected animals will be continuous shedders throughout their lifetime when the virus reactivates; therefore, successfully propagating the disease. The virus sheds in such high titers that it will spread rapidly throughout a herd. Even though cattle might not be showing clinical signs they can still spread the disease. Aside from cattle, studies experimentally infecting animals have shown that goats and buffalo can act as reservoirs for BoHV-1, as well as red deer, sheep, swine, and reindeer. Shedding begins from the nasal mucosa as soon as infection occurs, and the virus has replicated in the upper respiratory tract. During replication in the respiratory tract cells of the epithelial will undergo apoptosis. The necrosis in the epithelial will result in an entry site for secondary infections that may result in shipping fever.

== Clinical signs ==
=== Infectious bovine rhinotracheitis ===
The respiratory disease caused by BoHV-1 is commonly known as infectious bovine rhinotracheitis. This disease affects the upper respiratory tract as well as the reproductive tract of cattle, and is commonly found in feedlots across North America.

Clinical symptoms include fever, serous to mucopurulent nasal discharge, coughing, sneezing, difficulty breathing, conjunctivitis and loss of appetite. Ulcers commonly occur in the mouth and nose. Mortality may reach 10 percent.

IBR can also cause abortion. This generally occurs in mid-gestation when a susceptible cow is infected with BoHV-1. A viraemia occurs and subsequently the virus crossed the placenta and causes organ necrosis in the fetus. BoHV-1 also causes a generalized disease in newborn calves, characterized by enteritis and death.

=== Infectious pustular vulvovaginitis and infectious balanoposthitis ===
The genital disease causes infectious pustular vulvovaginitis in cows and infectious balanoposthitis in bulls. Symptoms include fever, depression, loss of appetite, painful urination, a swollen vulva with pustules, ulcers, vesicles and erosions in cows, and pain on sexual contact in bulls. In both cases lesions usually resolve within two weeks.

== Diagnosis ==
Clinical signs and history are normally enough to make a preliminary diagnosis. To definitively diagnose the infection the virus should be identified in the tissues by virus isolation or PCR, or in bulk milk samples by ELISA.

Serology may be performed to identify latent carriers, but it is not completely reliable as not all of the infected animals have detectable antibodies.

== Treatment and control ==
Treatment is symptomatic. Anti-inflammatories reduce fever and provide pain relief. Antibiotics may be necessary if a secondary infection occurs.

Vaccination is widely used both to protect cattle clinically in the case of infection and significantly reduce the shedding of the virus. Vaccination provides herd immunity, which lowers the likelihood of an animal coming into contact with an infected animal. Both inactivated and live attenuated vaccines are available. Immunity usually lasts approximately six months to one year. Marker vaccines are also available and recommended. Marker vaccines, also known as DIVA (differentiation of infected from vaccinated animals), have become popular in order to distinguish vaccinated animals from infected animals. A marker vaccine uses either deletion mutants or a virion subunit, such as glycoprotein E. Studies show that vaccinating after an animal has been infected decreases shedding of the disease and reduces reactivation of the latent virus, although not completely. Using a killed gE deleted marker vaccine after infection will reduce viral excretion following reactivation, using a dexamethasone treatment.

Animals showing clinical signs should be quarantined to stop the spread of the virus. The use of quarantine in herds with BoHV-1 is not ideal control program, as it is a latent virus and results in lifelong infection. However, new animals coming to a farm, or crossing borders, should be quarantined while tests for the virus are being undergone. Quarantine will also help contain the spread after an outbreak.

== Eradication ==
Countries such as Austria, Denmark, Finland, Sweden, Italy, Switzerland and Norway have eradicated the disease, while Canada and the United States have control programs in place for it. Eradication of the disease is a time-consuming process and requires diligent testing to be granted a disease free status. The possibilities of eradication rely upon whether the herd is vaccinated and the reactivation potential of the virus. In a small, vaccinated herd BoHV-1 can be eradicated within one or two decades, whereas in a large herds eradication is unlikely. Eradication was accomplished in Switzerland in 5 years using a four-step protocol focusing on preventions on transmission with trade barriers, slaughtering animals with antibodies to BHV-1, detection and eradication of further reservoirs (feedlot cattle), and then putting in place a monitoring program to maintain the control. This cost Switzerland a lot of money as they compensated producers who culled their seropositive animals. Eradication is a difficult goal for this disease, but being disease free opens barriers of trade with countries that have eradicated it as well, and saves producers money from the virus’ effects.

== Economic impact ==
BoHV-1 is a source of economic loss in both the dairy, and the beef industries in Canada due to a decrease in production, a higher susceptibility to secondary infections, and the occurrences of abortions. A particularly great cost associated with BoHV-1 involves its contribution to causing BRD (shipping fever), which is estimated to cost $500 million to US feedlots annually. It is also found economically important due to its association with reproductive problems, as study in Ethiopia depicted (Begna, 2021):The prevalence of IBR/BoHV-1 antibodies based on the history of reproductive disorders were varies among those have the history and the counterparts. Analysis of data revealed significantly higher seroprevalence of IBR/BoHV-1 antibodies in animal with history of repeat breeding (45.76%), retained fetal membrane (42.5%) and stillbirth (60.86%), than animals without the problems.

== See also ==
- Bovine herpesvirus (disambiguation)
