= Rhadinovirus =

Virus classification
- (unranked): Virus
- Realm: Duplodnaviria
- Kingdom: Heunggongvirae
- Phylum: Peploviricota
- Class: Herviviricetes
- Order: Herpesvirales
- Family: Orthoherpesviridae
- Subfamily: Gammaherpesvirinae
- Genus: Rhadinovirus

Species
- See text

Genus of viruses

Rhadinovirus (synonyms: Rhadinoviridae and gamma-2 herpesviruses) is a genus of viruses in the order Herpesvirales, in the family Orthoherpesviridae, in the subfamily Gammaherpesvirinae. Humans and other mammals serve as natural hosts. Diseases associated with this genus include: Kaposi's sarcoma, primary effusion lymphoma and multicentric Castleman's disease, caused by Human herpesvirus 8 (HHV-8), also known as Kaposi's sarcoma-associated herpesvirus (KSHV). The term rhadino comes from the Latin fragile, referring to the tendency of the viral genome to break apart when it is isolated.

== Species ==
The genus contains the following species, listed by scientific name and followed by the common name of the species:

- Rhadinovirus atelinegamma2, Ateline herpesvirus 2
- Rhadinovirus atelinegamma3, Herpesvirus ateles
- Rhadinovirus bovinegamma4, Bovine herpesvirus 4
- Rhadinovirus colobinegamma1, Colobine gammaherpesvirus 1
- Rhadinovirus cricetidgamma2, Rodent herpesvirus Peru
- Rhadinovirus humangamma8, Kaposi's sarcoma-associated herpesvirus or Human herpesvirus 8 (HHV-8)
- Rhadinovirus macacinegamma5, Rhesus rhadinovirus
- Rhadinovirus macacinegamma8, Macacine herpesvirus 8
- Rhadinovirus macacinegamma11, Japanese macaque rhadinovirus
- Rhadinovirus macacinegamma12, Pig-tailed macaque rhadinovirus 2
- Rhadinovirus muridgamma4, Murid herpesvirus 4
- Rhadinovirus muridgamma7, Wood mouse herpesvirus
- Rhadinovirus saimiriinegamma2, Herpesvirus saimiri

== Structure ==
Viruses in Rhadinovirus are enveloped viruses, with icosahedral, spherical to pleomorphic, and round geometries, and T=16 symmetry. The diameter is around 150-200 nm. The genomes of Rhadinoviruses are linear and non-segmented, and are approximately 180kb in length.

Genus	Structure	Symmetry	Capsid	Genomic arrangement	Genomic segmentation
Rhadinovirus	Spherical pleomorphic	T=16	Enveloped	Linear	Monopartite

== Life cycle ==
Viral replication is nuclear, and is lysogenic. Entry into the host cell is achieved by attachment of the viral glycoproteins to host receptors, which mediates endocytosis. Replication follows the dsDNA bidirectional replication model. DNA-templated transcription, with some alternative splicing mechanism is the method of transcription. Translation takes place by leaky scanning. The virus exits the host cell by nuclear egress, and budding. Humans and other mammals serve as natural hosts. Transmission routes are sexual, contact, and through saliva.

Genus	Host details	Tissue tropism	Entry details	Release details	Replication site	Assembly site	Transmission
Rhadinovirus	Humans; mammals	B-lymphocytes	Glycoproteins	Budding	Nucleus	Nucleus	Sex; saliva
