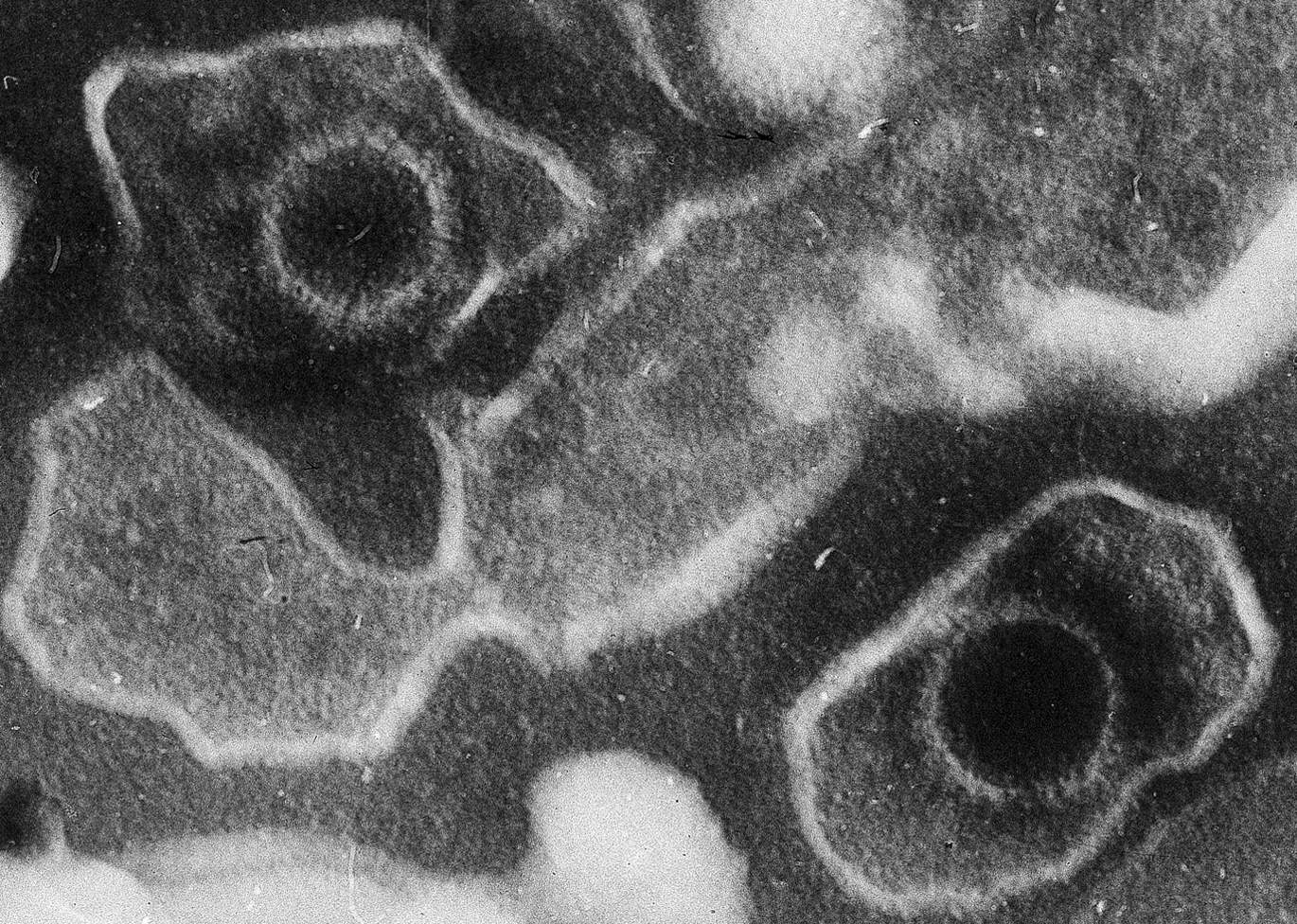
- Electron micrograph of two Epstein–Barr virus virions (viral particles) showing round capsids loosely surrounded by the membrane envelope

Virus classification
- (unranked): Virus
- Realm: Duplodnaviria
- Kingdom: Heunggongvirae
- Phylum: Peploviricota
- Class: Herviviricetes
- Order: Herpesvirales
- Family: Orthoherpesviridae
- Subfamily: Gammaherpesvirinae

Genera
- See text

= Gammaherpesvirinae =

Subfamily of viruses

Gammaherpesvirinae is a subfamily of viruses in the order Herpesvirales and in the family Orthoherpesviridae. Viruses in Gammaherpesvirinae are distinguished by reproducing at a more variable rate than other subfamilies of Orthoherpesviridae. Mammals serve as natural hosts. Viruses associated with disease in this subfamily include Epstein–Barr virus and Kaposi's sarcoma-associated herpesvirus.

== Taxonomy ==
Herpesviruses represent a group of double-stranded DNA viruses distributed widely within the animal kingdom. The family Orthoherpesviridae, which contains eight viruses that infect humans, is the most extensively studied group within this order and comprises three subfamilies, namely Alphaherpesvirinae, Betaherpesvirinae and Gammaherpesvirinae.

=== Genera ===
Gammaherpesvirinae consists of the following seven genera:

- Bossavirus
- Lymphocryptovirus
- Macavirus
- Manticavirus
- Patagivirus
- Percavirus
- Rhadinovirus

== Structure ==
Viruses in Gammaherpesvirinae are enveloped, with icosahedral, spherical to pleomorphic, and round geometries, and T=16 symmetry. The diameter is around 150-200 nm. Genomes are linear and non-segmented, around 180kb in length.

Genus	Structure	Symmetry	Capsid	Genomic arrangement	Genomic segmentation
Macavirus	Spherical pleomorphic	T=16	Enveloped	Linear	Monopartite
Percavirus	Spherical pleomorphic	T=16	Enveloped	Linear	Monopartite
Lymphocryptovirus	Spherical pleomorphic	T=16	Enveloped	Linear	Monopartite
Rhadinovirus	Spherical pleomorphic	T=16	Enveloped	Linear	Monopartite

== Life cycle ==
The main stages in the lifecycle of Gamma herpes virus are namely
• Virus attachment and entry
• Viral DNA injection through nuclear pore complex (NPC) into nucleus
• Assembly of nucleocapsids and encapsidation of viral genome
• Primary envelopment, invaginations of nuclear membranes and nuclear egress
• Tegumentation and secondary envelopment in the cytoplasm
• Egress and extracellular virions release

Genus	Host details	Tissue tropism	Entry details	Release details	Replication site	Assembly site	Transmission
Macavirus	Mammals	T-lymphocytes	Glycoproteins	Budding	Nucleus	Nucleus	Nasal and ocular secretion
Percavirus	Mammals	B-lymphocytes	Glycoproteins	Budding	Nucleus	Nucleus	Sex; saliva
Lymphocryptovirus	Humans; mammals	B-lymphocytes	Glycoproteins	Budding	Nucleus	Nucleus	Saliva
Rhadinovirus	Humans; mammals	B-lymphocytes	Glycoproteins	Budding	Nucleus	Nucleus	Sex; saliva

== Lytic cycle ==
The lytic cycle of the gammaherpesviruses is initiated only on rare occasions. Therefore, the least contribution to pathogenicity has to be expected from this stage. The ORFs expressed during that stage are further divided into immediate-early, early, and late. Promoter activation mediated by these proteins has also a strong effect on DNA synthesis from the origins of lytic DNA replication. As a result, virions are generated and released from the productively infected cells.

== Immune evasion strategies ==
Viruses that establish lifelong latent infections must ensure that the viral genome is maintained within the latently infected cell throughout the life of the host, yet at the same time must also be capable of avoiding elimination by the immune surveillance system especially must avoid being detected by host CD8+ cytotoxic T lymphocytes (CTLs). The gamma-herpesviruses are characteristically latent in lymphocytes and drive the proliferation that requires the expression of latent viral antigens. The majority of gammaherpesviruses encode a specific protein that is critical for maintenance of the viral genome within latently infected cells termed the genome maintenance protein (GMP). During latency, the genome persists in the nucleus of the infected cells as a circular episomal element. GMPs are DNA-binding proteins that ensure that, as the host cell progresses through mitosis, the viral episomes are partitioned to daughter cells. This provides continuous existence of the viral genome within the host cells.

MHV68 in genetically modified mice is used as a model for studying infection and host responses. Stable lifelong latency is a hallmark of the chronic phase of MHV68 infection. The spleen is a major infection site. The episomal maintenance protein for MHV68 is a latency-associated nuclear antigen (mLANA; ORF73). M2 protein mediates signaling pathways of infected B cells by interacting with SH2- and SH3-containing proteins. Host factors have been identified that can promote or antagonize MHV68 latency and reactivation.

== Human health ==
Gammaherpesviruses are of primary interest due to the two human viruses, EBV (Epstein–Barr virus) and KSHV (Kaposi's sarcoma-associated herpesvirus) and the diseases they cause. The gammaherpesviruses replicate and persist in lymphoid cells but some are capable of undergoing lytic replication in epithelial or fibroblast cells. Gammaherpesviruses may be a cause of chronic fibrotic lung diseases in humans and in animals.

Murid herpesvirus 68 is an important model system for the study of gammaherpesviruses with tractable genetics. The gammaherpesviruses, including HVS, EBV, KSHV, and RRV, are capable of establishing latent infection in lymphocytes.

Attenuated virus mutants represent a promising approach towards gamma-herpesvirus infection control. Surprisingly, latency-deficient and, therefore, apathogenic MHV-68 mutants are found to be highly effective vaccines against these viruses. Research in this area is almost exclusively performed using MHV68 as KSHV and EBV (the major human pathogens of this family) do not productively infect model organisms typically used for this type of experimentation.

== Growth de-regulating genes ==
Herpesviruses have large genomes containing a wide array of genes. Although the first ORF in these gammaherpesviruses have oncogenic potential, other viral genes may also play a role in viral transformation. A striking feature of the four gammaherpesviruses is that they contain distinct ORFs involved in lymphocyte signaling events. At the left end of each viral genome are located ORFs encoding distinct transforming proteins. Gammaherpesvirus genes are capable of modulating cellular signals such that cell proliferation and viral replication occur at the appropriate times in the viral life cycle.
