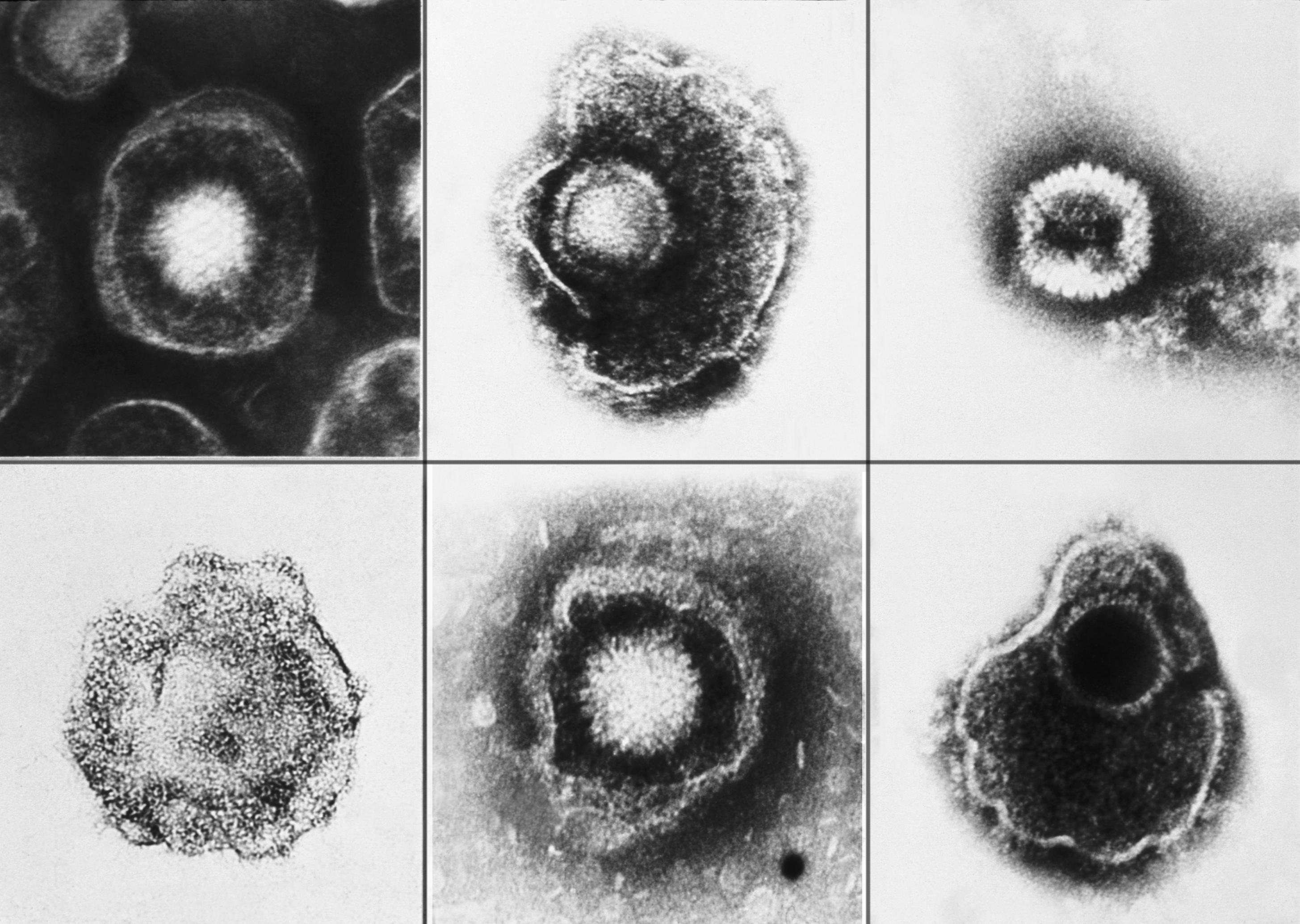

Virus classification
- (unranked): Virus
- Realm: Duplodnaviria
- Kingdom: Heunggongvirae
- Phylum: Peploviricota
- Class: Herviviricetes
- Order: Herpesvirales
- Family: Orthoherpesviridae

Subfamilies and genera
- See text

= Herpesviridae =

Family of DNA viruses

Orthoherpesviridae, previously named and more widely known as Herpesviridae, is a large family of DNA viruses that cause infections and certain diseases in animals, including humans. The members of this family are commonly known as herpesviruses. The family name is derived from the Greek word ἕρπειν (herpein 'to creep'), referring to spreading cutaneous lesions, usually involving blisters, seen in flares of herpes simplex 1, herpes simplex 2 and herpes zoster (shingles). In 1971, the International Committee on the Taxonomy of Viruses (ICTV) established Herpesvirus as a genus with 23 viruses among four groups. Since then, the number of identified herpesviruses has grown to more than 100. Herpesviruses can cause both latent and lytic infections.

Nine herpesvirus types are known to primarily infect humans, at least five of which are extremely widespread among most human populations, and which cause common diseases: herpes simplex 1 and 2 (HSV-1 and HSV-2, also known as HHV-1 and HHV-2; both of which can cause orolabial and genital herpes), varicella zoster (VZV or HHV-3; the cause of chickenpox and shingles), Epstein–Barr (EBV or HHV-4; implicated in several diseases, including mononucleosis and some cancers), and human cytomegalovirus (HCMV or HHV-5). More than 90% of adults have been infected with at least one of these, and a latent form of the virus remains in almost all humans who have been infected. Other human herpesviruses are human herpesvirus 6A and 6B (HHV-6A and HHV-6B) and human herpesvirus 7 (HHV-7), which are the etiological agents for Roseola, and HHV-8 (also known as KSHV) which is responsible for causing Kaposi's sarcoma. HHV here stands for "Human Herpesvirus".

In total, more than 130 herpesviruses are known, some of them from mammals, birds, fish, reptiles, amphibians, and molluscs. Among the animal herpesviruses are pseudorabies virus causing Aujeszky's disease in pigs, and bovine herpesvirus 1 causing bovine infectious rhinotracheitis and pustular vulvovaginitis.

== Taxonomy ==
The family has the following three subfamilies consisting of seventeen genera:

- Subfamily Alphaherpesvirinae
  - Iltovirus
  - Mardivirus
  - Scutavirus
  - Simplexvirus
  - Varicellovirus
- Subfamily Betaherpesvirinae
  - Cytomegalovirus
  - Muromegalovirus
  - Proboscivirus
  - Quwivirus
  - Roseolovirus
- Subfamily Gammaherpesvirinae
  - Bossavirus
  - Lymphocryptovirus
  - Macavirus
  - Manticavirus
  - Patagivirus
  - Percavirus
  - Rhadinovirus

A number of other herpesviruses were previously recognized as species but were abolished, so their exact taxonomic placement is uncertain. These viruses include: Chelonid alphaherpesvirus 6, Cercopithecine gammaherpesvirus 14, Equid gammaherpesvirus 7, Iguanid herpesvirus 2, Phocid gammaherpesvirus 2, and Saguinine gammaherpesvirus 1.

== Structure ==
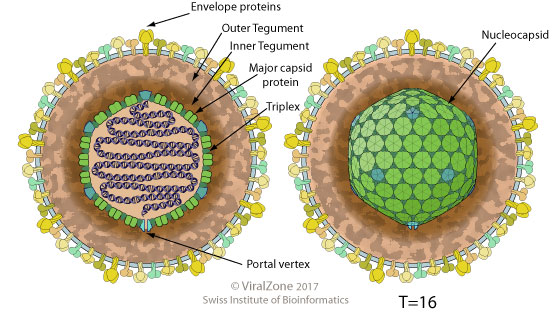
Schematic drawing of a Herpesviridae virion

All members of the Herpesviridae share a common structure; a relatively large, monopartite, double-stranded, linear DNA genome encoding 100–200 genes encased within an icosahedral protein cage (with T=16 symmetry) called the capsid, which is itself wrapped in a protein layer called the tegument containing both viral proteins and viral mRNAs and a lipid bilayer membrane called the envelope. This whole particle is known as a virion. The structural components of a typical HSV virion are the lipid bilayer envelope with embedded glycoprotein spikes, tegument and nucleocapsid.

The three-component Herpes simplex virion encompasses the double-stranded DNA genome that is part of the icosahedral nucleocapsid. There is tegument around. The tegument contains filaments, each 7 nm wide. It is an amorphous layer with some structured regions. The tegument contains 26 proteins. They have duties such as capsid transport to the nucleus and other organelles, activation of early gene transcription, and mRNA degradation.

Finally, the virion is covered with a lipoprotein envelope. There are spikes made of glycoprotein protruding from each virion. These can expand the diameter of the virus to 225 nm. The diameters of virions without spikes are around 186 nm. There are at least two unglycosylated membrane proteins in the outer envelope of the virion. There are also 11 glycoproteins. These are gB, gC, gD, gE, gG, gH, gI, gJ, gK, gL and gM.

The icosahedral nucleocapsid is similar to that of tailed bacteriophage in the order Caudovirales. This capsid has 161 capsomers consisting of 150 hexons and 11 pentons, as well as a portal complex that allows entry and exit of DNA into the capsid.

== Life cycle ==
All herpesviruses are nuclear-replicating—the viral DNA is transcribed to mRNA within the infected cell's nucleus.

Infection is initiated when a viral particle contacts a cell with specific types of receptor molecules on the cell surface. Following binding of viral envelope glycoproteins to cell membrane receptors, the virion is internalized and dismantled, allowing viral DNA to migrate to the cell nucleus. Within the nucleus, replication of viral DNA and transcription of viral genes occurs.

During symptomatic infection, infected cells transcribe lytic viral genes. In some host cells, a small number of viral genes termed latency-associated transcript (LAT) accumulate, instead. In this fashion, the virus can persist in the cell (and thus the host) indefinitely. While primary infection is often accompanied by a self-limited period of clinical illness, long-term latency is symptom-free.

Chromatin dynamics regulate the transcription competency of entire herpes virus genomes. When the virus enters a cell, the cellular immune response is to protect the cell. The cell does so by wrapping the viral DNA around histones and condensing it into chromatin, causing the virus to become dormant, or latent. If cells are unsuccessful and the chromatin is loosely bundled, the viral DNA is still accessible. The viral particles can turn on their genes and replicate using cellular machinery to reactivate, starting a lytic infection.

Reactivation of latent viruses has been implicated in a number of diseases (e.g. shingles, pityriasis rosea). Following activation, transcription of viral genes transitions from LAT to multiple lytic genes; these lead to enhanced replication and virus production. Often, lytic activation leads to cell death. Clinically, lytic activation is often accompanied by emergence of nonspecific symptoms, such as low-grade fever, headache, sore throat, malaise, and rash, as well as clinical signs such as swollen or tender lymph nodes and immunological findings such as reduced levels of natural killer cells.

In animal models, local trauma and system stress have been found to induce reactivation of latent herpesvirus infection. Cellular stressors like transient interruption of protein synthesis and hypoxia are also sufficient to induce viral reactivation.

Genus	Subfamily	Host details	Tissue tropism	Entry details	Release details	Replication site	Assembly site	Transmission
Iltovirus	α	Birds: galliform: psittacine	None	Cell receptor endocytosis	Budding	Nucleus	Nucleus	Oral-fecal, aerosol
Proboscivirus	β	Elephants	None	Glycoproteins	Budding	Nucleus	Nucleus	Contact
Cytomegalovirus	β	Humans; monkeys	Epithelial mucosa, hematopoietic (blood) lineage cells	Glycoproteins	Budding	Nucleus	Nucleus	Urine, saliva
Mardivirus	α	Chickens; turkeys; quail	None	Cell receptor endocytosis	Budding	Nucleus	Nucleus	Aerosol
Rhadinovirus	γ	Humans; mammals	B-lymphocytes	Glycoproteins	Budding	Nucleus	Nucleus	Sex, saliva
Macavirus	γ	Mammals	B-lymphocytes	Glycoproteins	Budding	Nucleus	Nucleus	Sex, saliva
Roseolovirus	β	Humans	T-cells; B-cells; NK-cell; monocytes; macrophages; epithelial	Glycoproteins	Budding	Nucleus	Nucleus	Respiratory contact
Simplexvirus	α	Humans; mammals	Epithelial mucosa	Cell receptor endocytosis	Budding	Nucleus	Nucleus	Sex, saliva
Scutavirus	α	Sea turtles	None	Cell receptor endocytosis	Budding	Nucleus	Nucleus	Aerosol
Varicellovirus	α	Mammals	Epithelial mucosa	Glycoproteins	Budding	Nucleus	Nucleus	Aerosol
Percavirus	γ	Mammals	B-lymphocytes	Glycoproteins	Budding	Nucleus	Nucleus	Sex, saliva
Lymphocryptovirus	γ	Humans; mammals	B-lymphocytes	Glycoproteins	Budding	Nucleus	Nucleus	Saliva
Muromegalovirus	β	Rodents	Salivary glands	Glycoproteins	Budding	Nucleus	Nucleus	Contact

== Evolution ==
The three mammalian subfamilies – Alpha-, Beta- and Gamma-herpesviridae – arose approximately 180 to 220 mya. The major sublineages within these subfamilies were probably generated before the mammalian radiation of 80 to 60 mya. Speciations within sublineages took place in the last 80 million years probably with a major component of cospeciation with host lineages.

All the currently known bird and reptile species are alphaherpesviruses. Although the branching order of the herpes viruses has not yet been resolved, because herpes viruses and their hosts tend to coevolve this is suggestive that the alphaherpesviruses may have been the earliest branch.

The time of origin of the genus Iltovirus has been estimated to be 200 mya while those of the mardivirus and simplex genera have been estimated to be between 150 and 100 mya.

== Immune system evasions ==
Herpesviruses are known for their ability to establish lifelong infections. One way this is possible is through immune evasion. Herpesviruses have many different ways of evading the immune system. One such way is by encoding a protein mimicking human interleukin 10 (hIL-10) and another is by downregulation of the major histocompatibility complex II (MHC II) in infected cells.

=== cmvIL-10 ===
Research conducted on cytomegalovirus (CMV) indicates that the viral human IL-10 homolog, cmvIL-10, is important in inhibiting pro-inflammatory cytokine synthesis. The cmvIL-10 protein has 27% identity with hIL-10 and only one conserved residue out of the nine amino acids that make up the functional site for cytokine synthesis inhibition on hIL-10. There is, however, much similarity in the functions of hIL-10 and cmvIL-10. Both have been shown to down regulate IFN-γ, IL-1α, GM-CSF, IL-6 and TNF-α, which are all pro-inflammatory cytokines. They have also been shown to play a role in downregulating MHC I and MHC II and up regulating HLA-G (non-classical MHC I). These two events allow for immune evasion by suppressing the cell-mediated immune response and natural killer cell response, respectively. The similarities between hIL-10 and cmvIL-10 may be explained by the fact that hIL-10 and cmvIL-10 both use the same cell surface receptor, the hIL-10 receptor. One difference in the function of hIL-10 and cmvIL-10 is that hIL-10 causes human peripheral blood mononuclear cells (PBMC) to both increase and decrease in proliferation whereas cmvIL-10 only causes a decrease in proliferation of PBMCs. This indicates that cmvIL-10 may lack the stimulatory effects that hIL-10 has on these cells.

It was found that cmvIL-10 functions through phosphorylation of the Stat3 protein. It was originally thought that this phosphorylation was a result of the JAK-STAT pathway. However, despite evidence that JAK does indeed phosphorylate Stat3, its inhibition has no significant influence on cytokine synthesis inhibition. Another protein, PI3K, was also found to phosphorylate Stat3. PI3K inhibition, unlike JAK inhibition, did have a significant impact on cytokine synthesis. The difference between PI3K and JAK in Stat3 phosphorylation is that PI3K phosphorylates Stat3 on the S727 residue whereas JAK phosphorylates Stat3 on the Y705 residue. This difference in phosphorylation positions seems to be the key factor in Stat3 activation leading to inhibition of pro-inflammatory cytokine synthesis. In fact, when a PI3K inhibitor is added to cells, the cytokine synthesis levels are significantly restored. The fact that cytokine levels are not completely restored indicates there is another pathway activated by cmvIL-10 that is inhibiting cytokine system synthesis. The proposed mechanism is that cmvIL-10 activates PI3K which in turn activates PKB (Akt). PKB may then activate mTOR, which may target Stat3 for phosphorylation on the S727 residue.

=== MHC downregulation ===
Another one of the many ways in which herpes viruses evade the immune system is by down regulation of MHC I and MHC II. This is observed in almost every human herpesvirus. Down regulation of MHC I and MHC II can come about by many different mechanisms, most causing the MHC to be absent from the cell surface. As discussed above, one way is by a viral chemokine homolog such as IL-10. Another mechanism to down regulate MHCs is to encode viral proteins that detain the newly formed MHC in the endoplasmic reticulum (ER). The MHC cannot reach the cell surface and therefore cannot activate the T cell response. The MHCs can also be targeted for destruction in the proteasome or lysosome. The ER protein TAP also plays a role in MHC down regulation. Viral proteins inhibit TAP preventing the MHC from picking up a viral antigen peptide. This prevents proper folding of the MHC and therefore the MHC does not reach the cell surface.

== Human herpesvirus types ==
Below are the nine distinct viruses in this family known to cause disease in humans.

Human herpesvirus (HHV) classification
Name	Synonym	Subfamily	Primary Target Cell	Syndrome	Site of Latency	Means of Spread
HHV‑1	Herpes simplex virus-1 (HSV-1)	α (Alpha)	Mucoepithelial	Oral and/or genital herpes, herpetic gingivostomatitis, pharyngitis, eczema herpeticum, herpetic whitlow, herpes simplex keratitis, erythema multiforme, encephalitis, as well as other herpes simplex infections	Neuron (sensory ganglia)	Close contact (oral or sexually transmitted infection)
HHV-2	Herpes simplex virus-2 (HSV-2)	α	Mucoepithelial	Oral and/or genital herpes, herpetic gingivostomatitis, pharyngitis, eczema herpeticum, herpetic whitlow, herpes simplex keratitis, erythema multiforme, Mollaret's meningitis, as well as other herpes simplex infections	Neuron (sensory ganglia)	Close contact (oral or sexually transmitted infection)
HHV-3	Varicella zoster virus (VZV)	α	Mucoepithelial	Chickenpox, shingles and postherpetic neuralgia, ophthalmic shingles, viral keratitis, Mollaret's meningitis and Ramsay Hunt syndrome type 2	Neuron (sensory ganglia)	Respiratory and close contact (including sexually transmitted infection)
HHV-4	Epstein–Barr virus (EBV) Lymphocryptovirus	γ (Gamma)	B cells and epithelial cells	Severe mosquito bite allergy, Epstein-Barr virus-positive reactive lymphoid hyperplasia, Infectious mononucleosis, Burkitt's lymphoma, Epstein–Barr virus-positive Hodgkin lymphoma, extranodal NK/T cell lymphoma, nasal type, Epstein–Barr virus-associated aggressive NK cell leukemia, CNS lymphoma in AIDS patients, post-transplant lymphoproliferative syndrome (PTLD), nasopharyngeal carcinoma, HIV-associated hairy leukoplakia, multiple sclerosis, Chronic active EBV infection	B cell	Close contact, transfusions, tissue transplant, and congenital
HHV-5	Cytomegalovirus (CMV)	β (Beta)	Monocytes and epithelial cells	Infectious mononucleosis-like syndrome, retinitis	Monocyte, and ?	Saliva, urine, blood, breast milk
HHV-6A and 6B	Roseolovirus	β	T cells and ?	Sixth disease (roseola infantum or exanthem subitum)	T cells and ?	Respiratory and close contact?
HHV-7	Roseolovirus	β	T cells and ?	drug-induced hypersensitivity syndrome, encephalopathy, hemiconvulsion-hemiplegia-epilepsy syndrome, hepatitis infection, postinfectious myeloradiculoneuropathy, pityriasis rosea, and the reactivation of HHV-4 (EBV), leading to "mononucleosis-like illness"	T cells and ?	?
HHV-8	Kaposi's sarcoma-associated herpesvirus (KSHV), a type of Rhadinovirus	γ	Lymphocyte and other cells	Kaposi's sarcoma, primary effusion lymphoma, some types of multicentric Castleman's disease	B cell	Close contact (sexual), saliva?

=== Zoonotic herpesviruses ===
In addition to the herpesviruses considered endemic in humans, some viruses associated primarily with animals may infect humans. These are zoonotic infections:

Zoonotic herpesviruses
Species	Type	Synonym	Subfamily	Human Pathophysiology
Macaque monkey	CeHV-1	Cercopithecine herpesvirus 1, (monkey B virus)	α	Very unusual, with only approximately 25 human cases reported. Untreated infection is often deadly; sixteen of the 25 cases resulted in fatal encephalomyelitis. At least four cases resulted in survival with severe neurologic impairment. Symptom awareness and early treatment are important for laboratory workers facing exposure.
Mouse	MuHV-4	Murid herpesvirus 68 (MHV-68)	γ	Zoonotic infection more common in laboratory workers handling infected mice. ELISA tests show factor-of-four (x4) false positive results, due to antibody cross-reaction with other herpesviruses.

== Animal herpesviruses ==
In animal virology, the best known herpesviruses belong to the subfamily Alphaherpesvirinae. Research on pseudorabies virus (PrV), the causative agent of Aujeszky's disease in pigs, has pioneered animal disease control with genetically modified vaccines. PrV is now extensively studied as a model for basic processes during lytic herpesvirus infection, and for unraveling molecular mechanisms of herpesvirus neurotropism, whereas bovine herpesvirus 1, the causative agent of bovine infectious rhinotracheitis and pustular vulvovaginitis, is analyzed to elucidate molecular mechanisms of latency. The avian infectious laryngotracheitis virus is phylogenetically distant from these two viruses and serves to underline similarity and diversity within the Alphaherpesvirinae.

== Research ==
Research is currently ongoing into a variety of side-effect or co-conditions related to the herpesviruses. These include:

- Alzheimer's disease
- atherosclerosis
- cholangiocarcinoma
- chronic fatigue syndrome
- Crohn's disease
- dysautonomia
- fibromyalgia
- Irritable bowel syndrome
- labile hypertension
- lupus
- Ménière's disease
- multiple sclerosis
- pancreatic cancer
- pancreatitis
- pityriasis rosea
- Type II Diabetes

== See also ==
- Acciptrid herpesvirus 1
- Agua Preta virus, a potential herpesvirus
