= Epilepsy in animals =

Epilepsy in animals is a group of neurological disorders characterized by seizures, caused by uncontrolled, abnormal bursts of electrical activity in the brain. They can start and stop very abruptly and last any amount of time from a few seconds to a few minutes. Canine epilepsy is often genetic, but epilepsy in cats and other pets is rarer, likely because there is no hereditary component to epilepsy in these animals.

== Characteristics ==
Epilepsy is most commonly recognised by involuntary movements of the head and limbs; however, other characteristics include salivation, lack of bodily functions and anxiety. Animals often lose consciousness and are not aware of their surroundings.

== Dogs ==
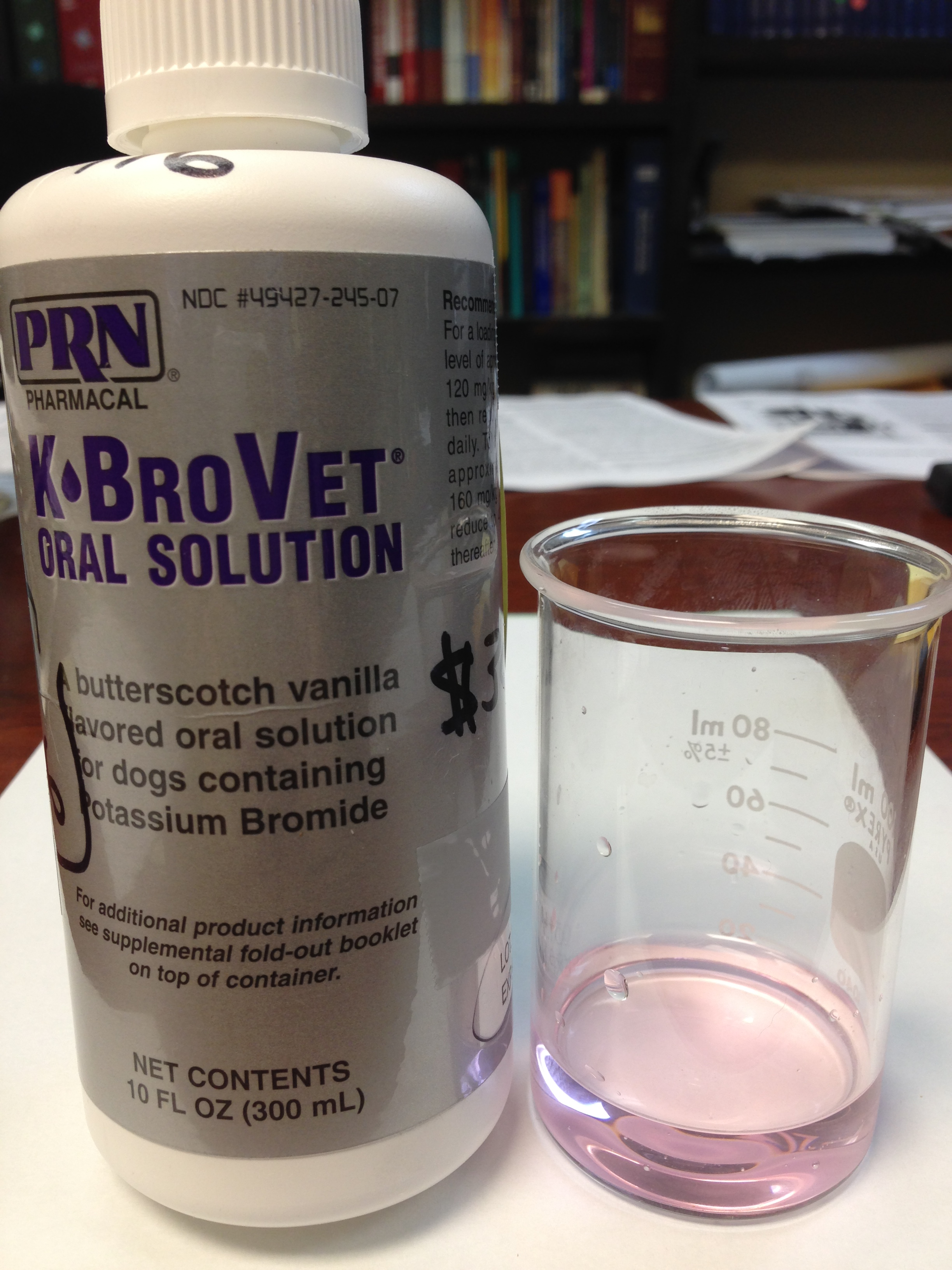
A bottle of veterinary pharmaceutical potassium bromide oral solution used in dogs, primarily as an antiepileptic (to stop seizures)

In dogs, epilepsy is often an inherited condition. The incidence of epilepsy/seizures in the general dog population is estimated to be between 0.5% and 5.7%. In certain breeds, such as the Belgian Shepherd, the incidence may be much higher. Poorly controlled seizures can progress to seizure clusters (several seizures within 24 to 48 hours) or status epilepticus (continuous seizure activity), which can be fatal, so veterinarians usually start anti-seizure medication after a cluster, after status epilepticus, or after more than two seizures in six months.

=== Diagnosis ===
There are three types of epilepsy in dogs: reactive, secondary, and primary. Reactive epileptic seizures are caused by metabolic issues, such as low blood sugar or kidney or liver failure. Epilepsy attributed to brain tumor, stroke or other trauma is known as secondary or symptomatic epilepsy.

There is no known cause for primary or idiopathic epilepsy, which is diagnosed only by eliminating other possible causes for the seizures. Dogs with idiopathic epilepsy experience their first seizure between the ages of one and three. However, the age at diagnosis is only one factor in diagnosing canine epilepsy, as one study found cause for seizures in one-third of dogs between the ages of one and three, indicating secondary or reactive rather than primary epilepsy.

A veterinarian's initial work-up for a dog presenting with a history of seizures may include a physical and neurological exam, a complete blood count, serum chemistry profile, urinalysis, bile tests, and thyroid function tests. These tests verify seizures and may determine cause for reactive or secondary epilepsy. Veterinarians may also request that dog owners keep a "seizure log" documenting the timing, length, severity, and recovery of each seizure, as well as dietary or environmental changes.

=== Treatment ===
Many antiepileptic drugs are used for the management of canine epilepsy. Oral phenobarbital, in particular, levetiracetam and imepitoin are considered to be the most effective antiepileptic drugs and usually used as 'first line' treatment. Other anti-epileptics, such as zonisamide, primidone, gabapentin, pregabalin, sodium valproate, felbamate and topiramate, may also be effective and used in various combinations. A crucial part of the treatment of pets with epilepsy is owner education to ensure compliance and successful management.

== Cats ==
Seizures in cats have various initiating factors. Cats can have reactive, primary (idiopathic) or secondary seizures. Idiopathic seizures are not as common in cats as in dogs; however, a 2008 study conducted showed that of 91 feline seizures, 25% were suspected to have had idiopathic epilepsy. In the same group of 91 cats, 50% were secondary seizures and 20% reactive.

=== Classifications ===
Idiopathic epilepsy does not have a classification due to the fact there are no known causes of these seizures, however both reactive and symptomatic secondary epilepsy can be placed into classifications.

==== Cancer ====
Meningiomas, lymphomas and glial cell brain tumours are the most common cancers in cats and are all common causes of seizures.

==== Vascular disease ====
Vascular disease refers to any condition that effects the flow of blood to the brain and can potentially result in seizure disorders. Common vascular diseases in cats include, feline ischemic encephalopathy, polycythemia and hypertension.

==== Inflammatory/infectious ====
Any inflammatory or infectious disease that reaches the brain can result in inducing seizures. The most common inflammatory or infectious diseases which cause seizures in cats include, feline infectious peritonitis, Toxoplasmosis and Cryptococcus.

==== Reactive seizure disorders ====
Many diseases that occur as a result from illness in parts of the body other than the brain can cause felines to have seizures, especially in older cats. Some of the common metabolic causes of seizures in felines include, hepatic encephalopathy, renal encephalopathy, hypoglycaemia and hypothyroidism.

== Other animals ==
- Birds are diagnosed with idiopathic epilepsy once all other causes of seizures have been ruled out and when they exhibit normal behavior between seizures. Birds cannot obtain therapeutic levels of the anticonvulsant phenobarbital in their blood. As of 2012 there are no published therapeutic levels for anticonvulsants in birds. Drug therapy, therefore, is individualized to the bird patient, and in most cases seizures can be successfully managed, providing a good quality of life for the bird.
- Zebrafish have been studied as model organisms for epilepsy research in place of the more widely-used rodents. Zebrafish are already widely used to research central nervous system disorders (such as Parkinson’s and Alzheimer’s Disease). Zebrafish were first used as a model for epilepsy in 2005, and since then have been used as such in hundreds of papers.
- California sea lions can develop epilepsy after consuming domoic acid, the neurotoxin responsible for amnesic shellfish poisoning. Their epilepsy has been compared to temporal lobe epilepsy in humans, for which they have been considered a model for.
- Cattle with idiopathic epilepsy have been rarely described in the literature. This is because larger animals have a higher threshold for seizures, and in most cases the cause of seizures in cattle can be determined to be from metabolic or toxic disorders.

== See also ==
- Canine epileptoid cramping syndrome
- Epilepsy in gerbils
- Rage syndrome
