= CECS =

CECS may refer to:

- Centro de Estudios Científicos (Center for Scientific Studies), a multidisciplinary research centre in Valdivia, Chile
- Canine epileptoid cramping syndrome, a disease affecting dogs, also known as Spike's Disease
- Computers in education and cognitive systems
- The Church of England Children's Society
- Chronic exertional compartment syndrome
