= Bunting (animal behavior) =

Animal behavior

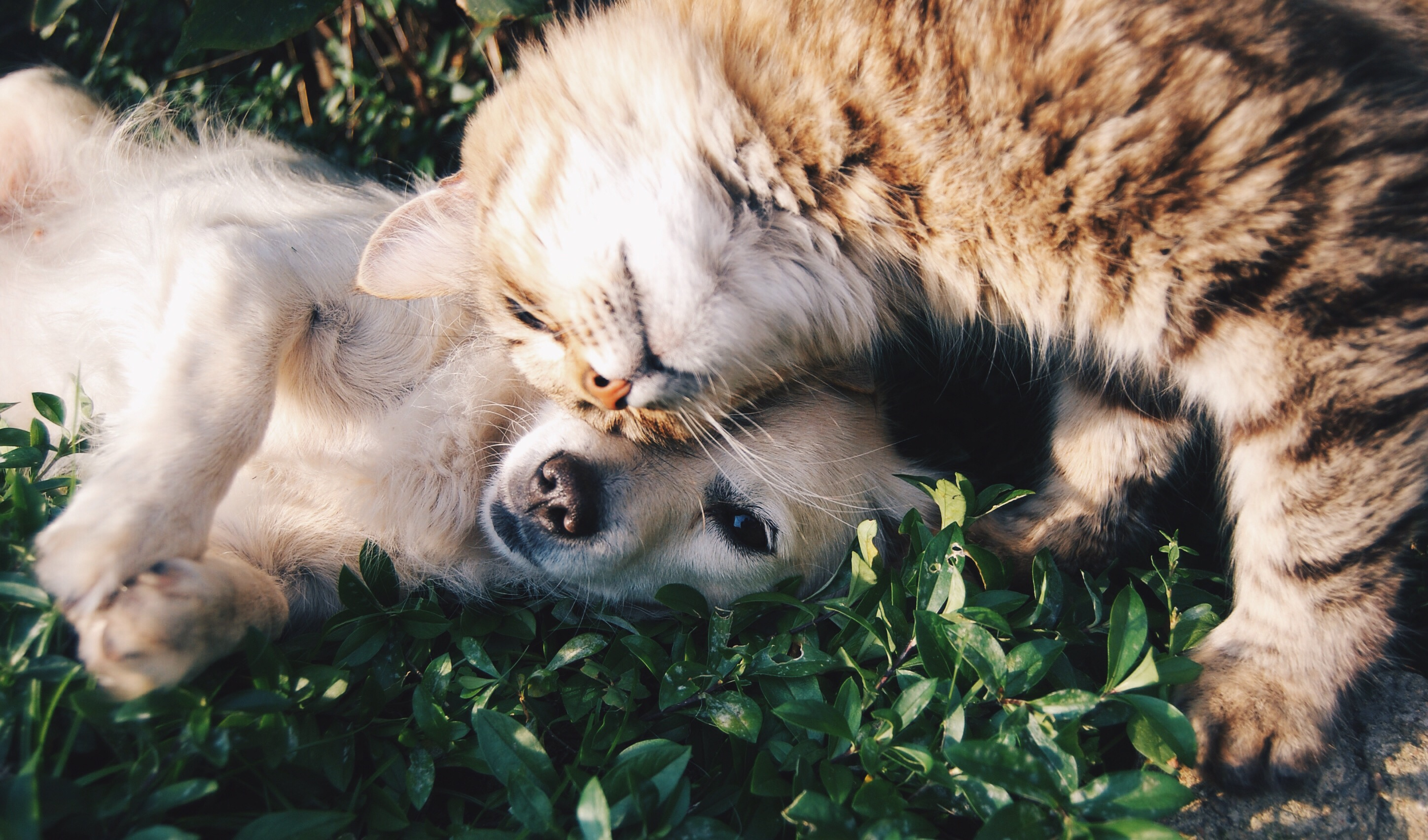
A cat demonstrating bunting behaviour on a dog.

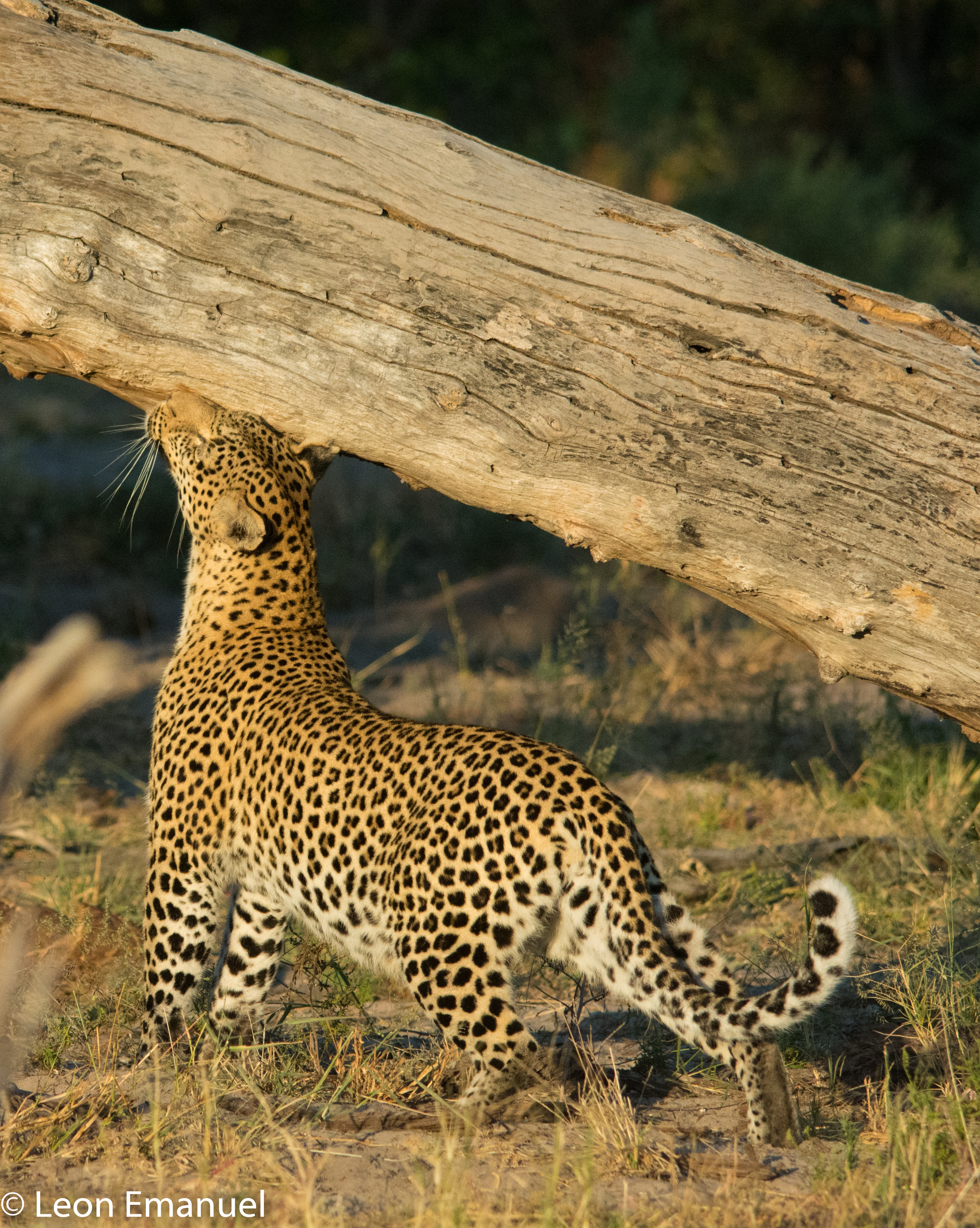
A leopard rubbing a tree

Bunting is a form of animal behavior, often found in felids, in which the animal butts or rubs its head against other things, including people. Bunting is generally considered to be a form of territorial scent-marking behaviour, where the cat rubs the scent glands on its cheeks and forehead on the object being marked.

After a display of aggression, a cat will begin bunting nearby objects as a form of territorial display toward a rival cat. Bunting and allorubbing (using touch to communicate closeness) are also part of feral cat behavior within colonies. An elaborate ritual which can take several minutes, two cats will rub along the side and tail of the other cat. This behaviour in domestic cats involves a system of hierarchy and may have evolved as a way to channel aggression where the cost of a conflict is too high. Cats also use bunting as a way to familiarize themselves with their environment, and the pheromones released through this work to ease the cat's anxieties about an unfamiliar area.

Bunting as a behaviour can be viewed as a variation of scent rubbing. This is when an animal, typically a carnivore, will rub its back on a scent, such as that of prey, or on the urine of an animal of the same species. Evolutionarily speaking, scent rubbing is the oldest form of scent communication and bunting is a derivative of this behaviour. Rolling in the scent of another animal was an adaptation to camouflage the scent of a predator or outside male, in order to get closer to mates.

Bunting is a normal animal behavior, and should be distinguished from head pressing, which is abnormal and typically a sign of illness.

== Development ==
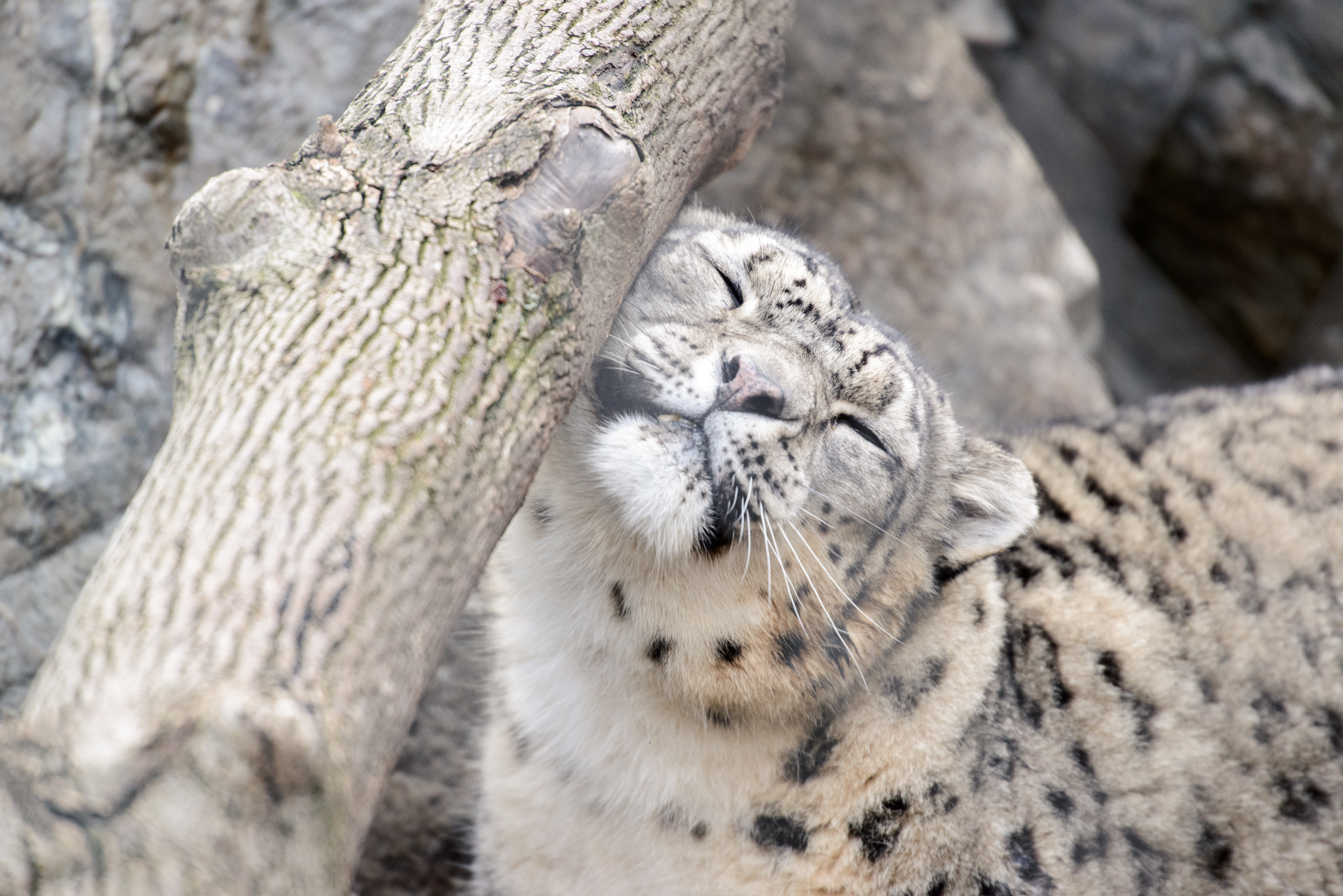
A snow leopard rubbing his head on a tree

The practice of bunting stems from the behaviour that arises when kittens are very young and seek stimulation from their mother by rubbing and kneading. This behaviour develops throughout the animal's life and is not only found in cats. It has also been found in other carnivorous mammals and some ungulates. Bunting in ungulates has no olfactory function but may have a role in the weaning of young. When a juvenile is nursing from its mother, it will bunt the udder with its head. This is to stimulate milk production or "let down" and causes some pain to the mother when the bunting movement is frequently performed.

Over time, there is an increase in the number of times the udder is bunted by the young. This causes the mother to react in an attempt to prevent further pain. This reaction of the mother can be any form of defensive behaviour from a nipping bite, moving away from the young, or a jab of her horns. Bunting in domesticated and wild cat species has olfactory roots and has a range of uses which include, but are not limited to, mother-young association bonds, greeting/welcoming of kin, diffusing potential aggression in social environments, and distributing scent on areas to cultivate familiarity.

== Bunting in other species ==
=== Cattle ===
Bunting behaviour is a display of aggression in cattle. When two cattle are rivaling each other, they will often use bunting as a form of defense. Cattle will attempt to bunt the rival animal with the goal of bunting its head under the hind legs of the other animal. This occurs when one animal shows submission during the final moments of a feud; this specific behavior is called clinching. The behaviour of bunting within cattle is first observable in calves. As a form of play-fighting, a young calf will bunt the flank of its mother. A newborn calf will bunt the mother's udder and this stimulates milk flow. It has been found that when calves are taken from their mothers and raised artificially, the calf will attempt to bunt the artificial teat when milk is not being produced quickly enough.

=== Horses ===
As seen in cattle, horse foals will bunt the mother's udder in order to stimulate milk production. Another example of bunting is when a dam experiences pain while a foal is suckling. The dam will proceed to bunt the foal with her head, non-aggressively, to prevent further discomfort. Many foals will play fight with one another; displaying the bunting behaviour. The foal will push its head against another foal's body in an attempt to knock the other off-balance.

Horses will also rub the bottom or sides of their jaw onto others. This self-grooming social interaction can have a calming effect for the horses involved, and dominant horses are more likely to initiate the behavior.

=== Lions ===
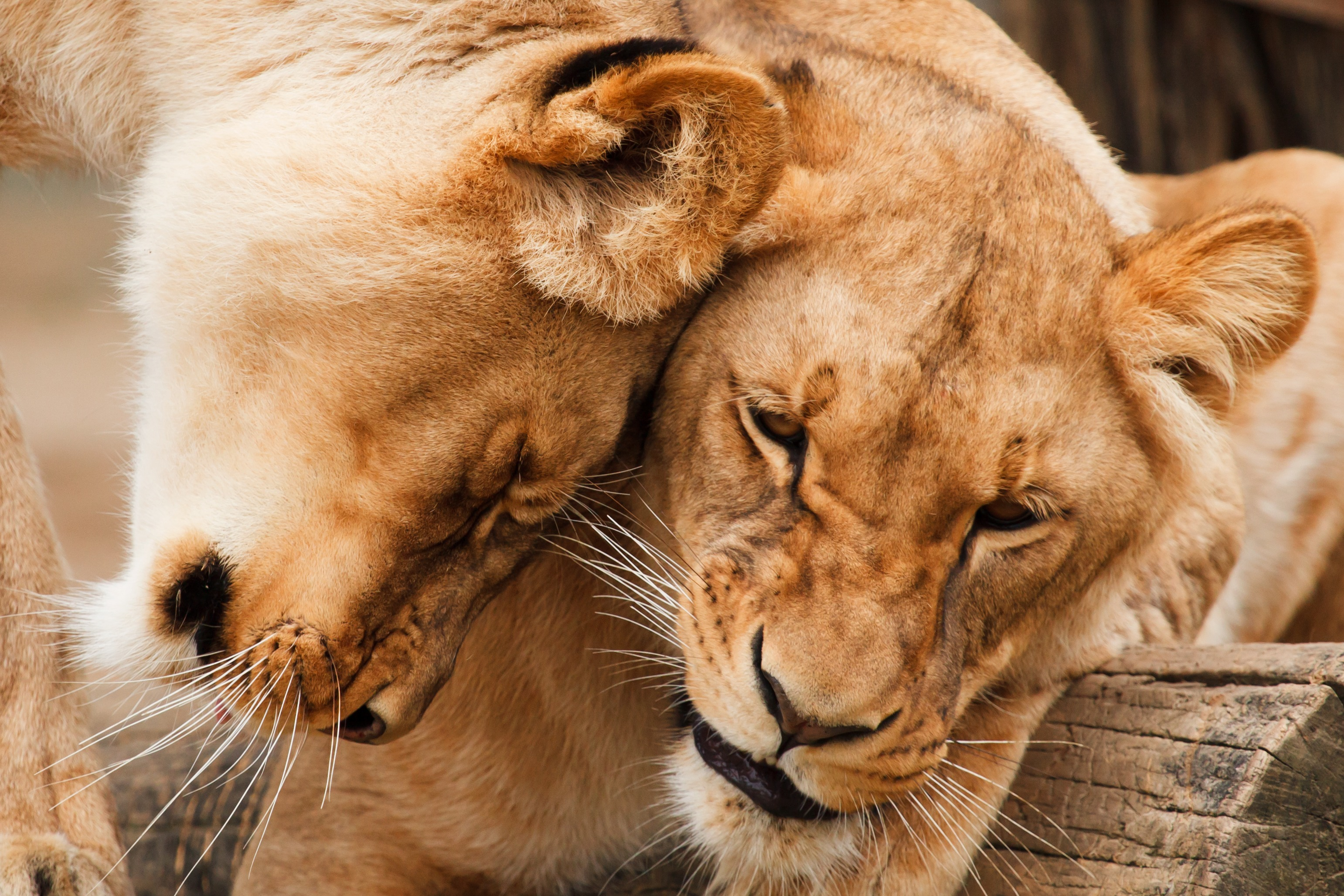
Lions display bunting as a form of greeting when met with other pride members.

Similarly to domesticated cats, lions also use bunting as a form of greeting and territorial marking. Lions will often greet each other with this head bunting behavior when returning to a pride after a hunt. In the early stages of life, cubs procure stimulation from their mother as she cleans them by rubbing and licking them. This behaviour carries throughout their lives and bunting remains a primal source of interaction between adults as it stimulates a familiar interaction between kin.

== See also ==
- Cat communication
- Social grooming
