= Sulfur water =

Water exposed to hydrogen sulfide gas

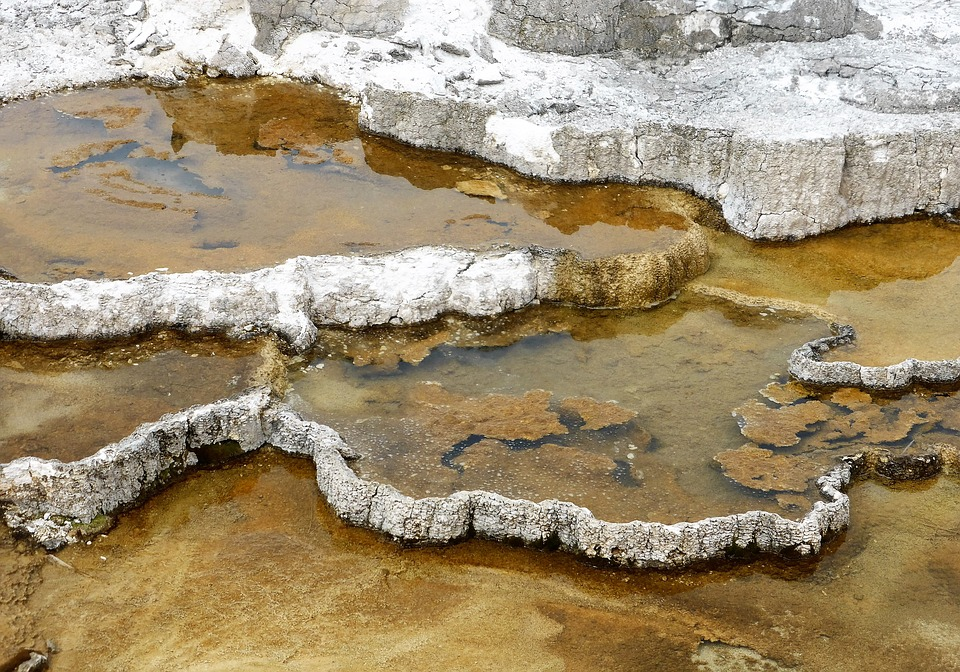
Water heavily contaminated with sulfur

Sulfur water (or sulphur water) is a condition where water is exposed to hydrogen sulfide gas, giving it a distinct "rotten egg" smell. This condition has different purposes in culture varying from health to implications for plumbing.

== Chemical composition ==
Sulfur water is made out of dissolved minerals that contain sulfate. These include baryte (BaSO_{4}), epsomite (MgSO_{4} 7H_{2}O) and gypsum (CaSO_{4}2H_{2}0). It is reported that a notable change in taste to the water is found dependent upon the type of sulfate affecting the water. For sodium sulfate, 250 to 500 mg/litre, with calcium sulfate at 250 to 1000 mg/litre and magnesium sulfate at 400 to 600 mg/litre. A study by Zoeteman found that having 270 mg of calcium sulfate and 90 mg of magnesium sulfate actually had improved the taste of the water.

== Health ==
Bathing in water high in sulfur or other minerals for its presumed health benefits is known as balneotherapy. These are said to give a person bathing in the waters "ageless beauty" and relief from aches and pains.

While humans have been able to adapt to higher levels of concentrations with time, some effects of ingestion of sulfur water has found to have cathartic effects on people consuming water with sulfate concentrations of 600 mg/litre according to a study from the US Department of health in 1962. Some adverse effects that have been found include dehydration, with excess amounts of sodium or magnesium sulfate in a person's diet according to a study in 1980, with some populations, such as children and elderly people, being seen as higher risk.

A survey was done in North Dakota US to better derive whether there was direct causation of a laxative effect from having sulfur in drinking water.

Results of Survey
Sulfate concentrate in drinking water	Percentage of people who reported a laxative effect
<500 mg of sulfate per litre	21%
500–1000 mg of sulfate per litre	28%
1000–1500 mg per litre	68%

From this data, it was concluded that water containing more than 750 mg of sulfate per litre was due to a laxative effect, and below 600 was not.

=== Concerns ===
According to the Environmental Protection Agency (EPA) and the Centers for Disease Control and Prevention (CDC), drinking water with high levels of sulfate can cause diarrhea, especially in infants.

== Cultural implications ==
=== Farming ===
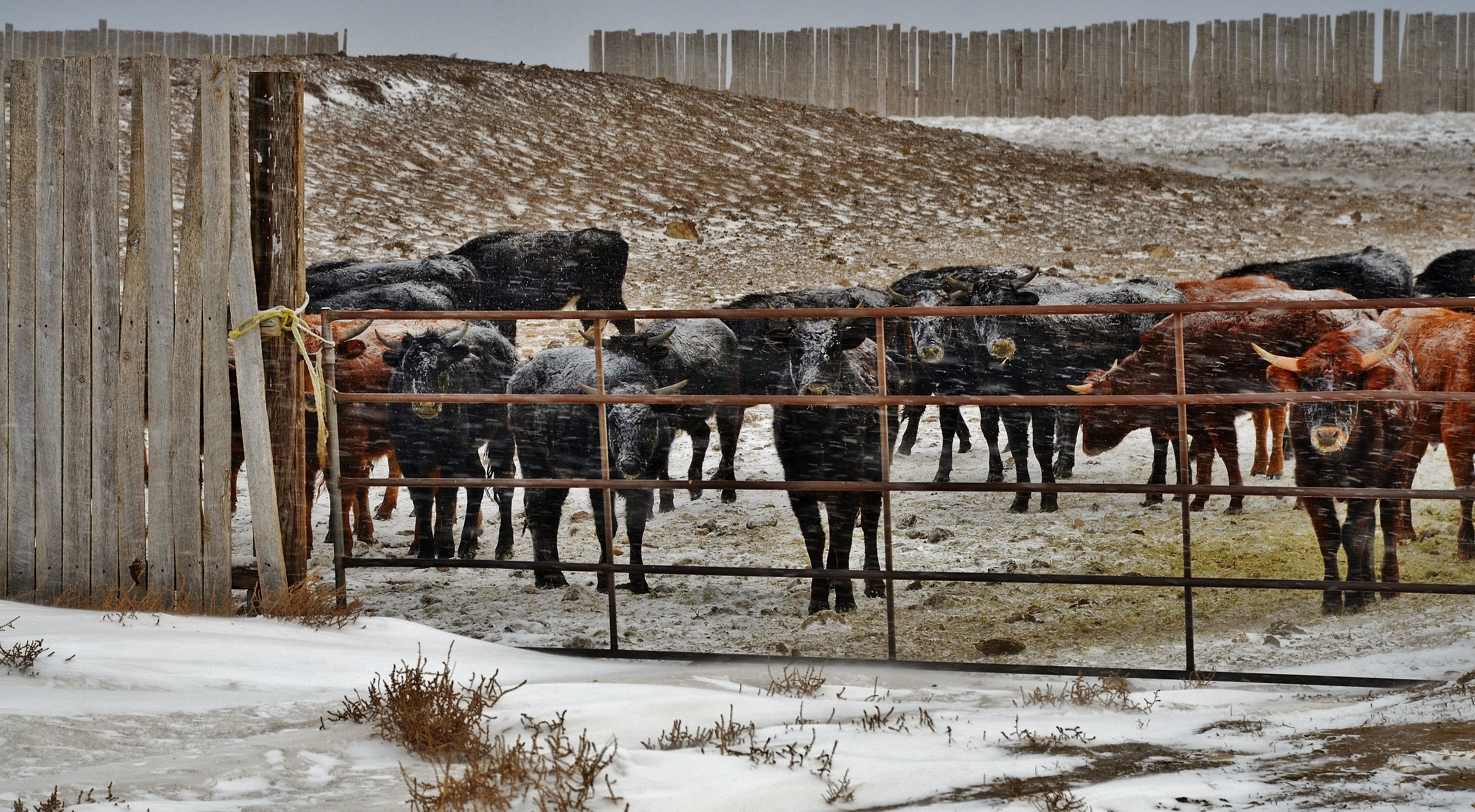
Cattle in Wyoming

At the University of Wyoming in America, sulfur water was studied to see the effects it can have upon the performance of steers that are on a forage-based diet. Due to sulfur being a requirement to living things, as it is present in essential amino acids that are used to create proteins, sulfur water, which is commonly found in Western States of America, is a major contributor to sulfur in the herds diet. However, with a herd drinking high concentrate of sulfur water, ruminants may contract sulfur induced polioencephalomalacia (sPEM), which is a neurological disorder. Because of this finding, the study tries to reach the goal of finding a dietary supplement which can be used to counteract the negative health effects on the steers.

To reduce the extra sulfur in the ruminant's diet, ruminal bacteria break the excess down, resulting in Hydrogen Sulfide, which is soluble in water, but as temperature increases, the solubility decreases, which leads to the hydrogen sulfide gas being reinhaled by the animal, causing sulfur induced polioencephalomalacia. The study attempted to resolve this issue by introducing clinoptilolite to the diet of the herd, but has found inconclusive evidence which requires more study of clinoptilolite effects on methanogenesis and biohydrogenation.

=== Sulfur springs ===
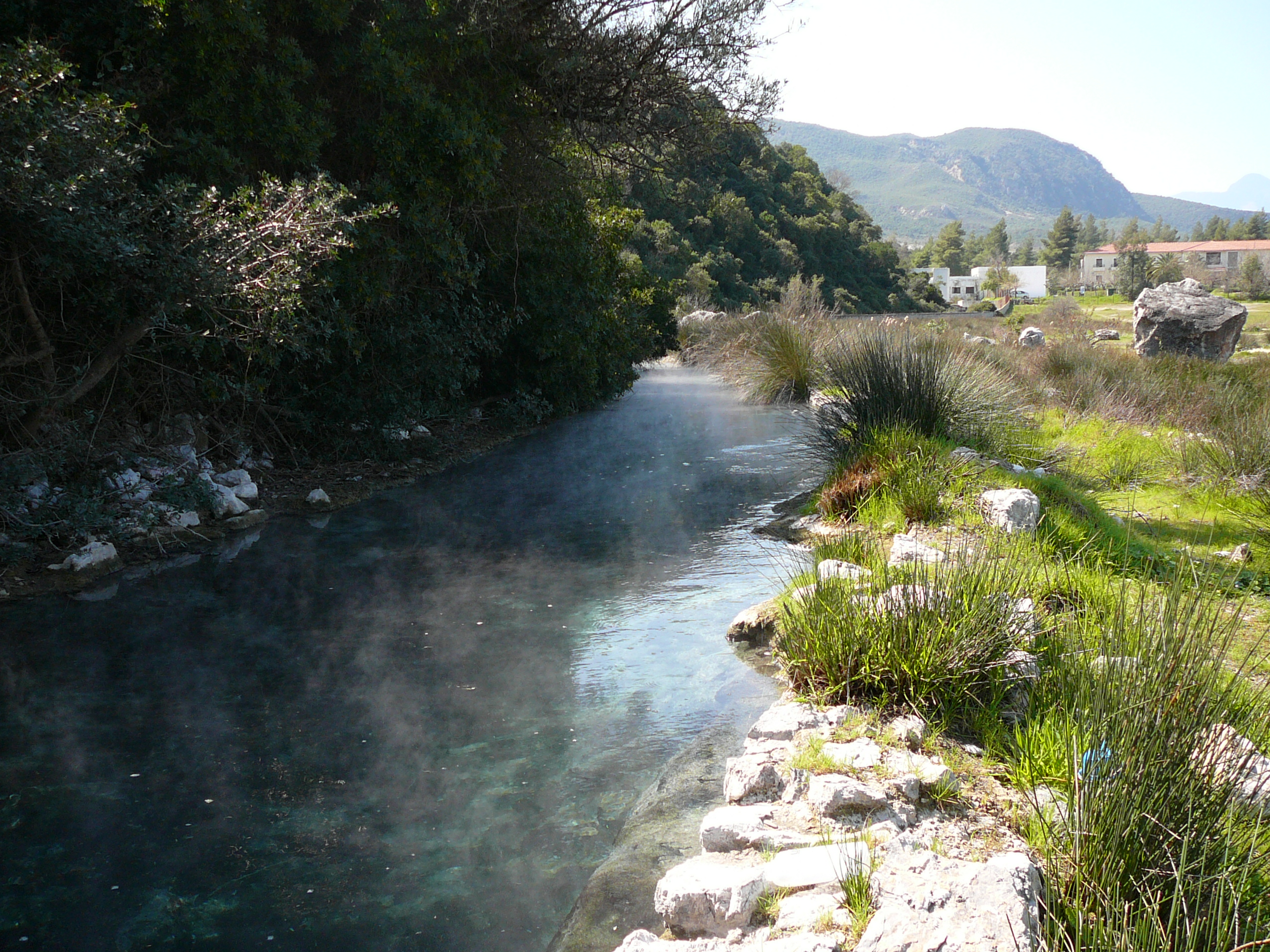
A sulfur spring in Thermopylae

There are also believed to be great health benefits attributed to sulfur water, a phenomenon present within many cultures. Sulfur springs can be found in many countries such as New Zealand, Japan, and Greece. These springs are often created due to local volcanic activity which contributes to heating of nearby water systems and the volcanoes exhaling water vapor heavily laden in metals, with sulfur dioxide being one of them.

In New Zealand, the North Island was brought to fame in the 1800s, with its baths heated naturally from a volcano near the town of Rotorua. There are 28 spa hot pools in which visitors can soak themselves, along with sulfur mud baths.

Another famous spring, Thermopylae, Greece, derives its name from its springs, translating to "hot springs", as it was believed to be the entrance to Hades.

== Cause and treatment ==
The condition indicates a high level of sulfate-reducing bacteria in the water supply. This may be due to the use of well water, poorly treated city water, or water heater contamination.

Various methods exist to treat sulfur in water. These methods include

1. Filtration of the water using a carbon filter (useful for very small amounts of hydrogen sulfide)
2. Filtration of the water through a canister of manganese oxide coated greensand
3. Aeration of the water
4. Chlorination of water (can be used to treat large amounts of hydrogen sulfide)

== Levels of sulfur in water around the world ==
The Global Environment Monitoring System for Freshwater (GEMS/Water) has said that typical fresh water holds about 20 mg/litre of sulfur, and can range from 0 to 630 mg/litre in rivers, 2 to 250 mg/litre in lakes and 0 to 230 mg/litre in groundwater.

Canada's rain has been found to have sulfate concentrations of 1.0 and 3.8 mg/L in 1980, found in a study by Franklin published in 1985. Western Canada in rivers ranged from 1 to 3040 mg/litre, with most concentrations below 580 mg/litre according to results from Environment Canada in 1984. Central Canada had levels that were also high in Saskatchewan, there were median levels of 368 mg/litre in drinking water from ground water supplies, and 97 mg/litre in surface water supplies, with a range of 32170 mg/litre.

A study conducted in Canada found that a treatment to reduce sulfur in drinking water had actually increased it. This was conducted in Ontario, which had a mean sulfur level of 12.5 mg/litre when untreated, and 22.5 mg/litre after the treatment.

The Netherlands has had below 150 mg/litre concentrations of sulfur water in their underground water supplies. 65% of water treatment plants reported that the sulfur level of drinking water was below 25 mg/litre, as found in a study by Dijk-Looijaard & Fonds in 1985.

The US had the Public Health Service in 1970 to measure levels of sulfate in drinking water sources in nine different geographic areas. The results concluded that all of the 106 surface water supplies that were sampled had sulfate present, as well as 645 of 658 ground water deposits that were tested. The levels of sulfur that was found ranged from less than 1 mg/litre to 770.

== Environment ==
Due to sulfates being used in industrial products, they are often discharged into water supplies in the environment. This includes mines, textile mills and other industrial processes that involve using sulfates. Sulfates, such as magnesium, potassium and sodium are all highly soluble in water, which is what creates sulfur water, while other sulfates which are metal based, such as calcium and barium are less soluble. Atmospheric sulfur dioxide, also can infect surface water, and sulfur trioxide can combine with water vapour in the air, and create sulfur water rain, or what is colloquially known as acid rain.
