= Head pressing =

Veterinary condition

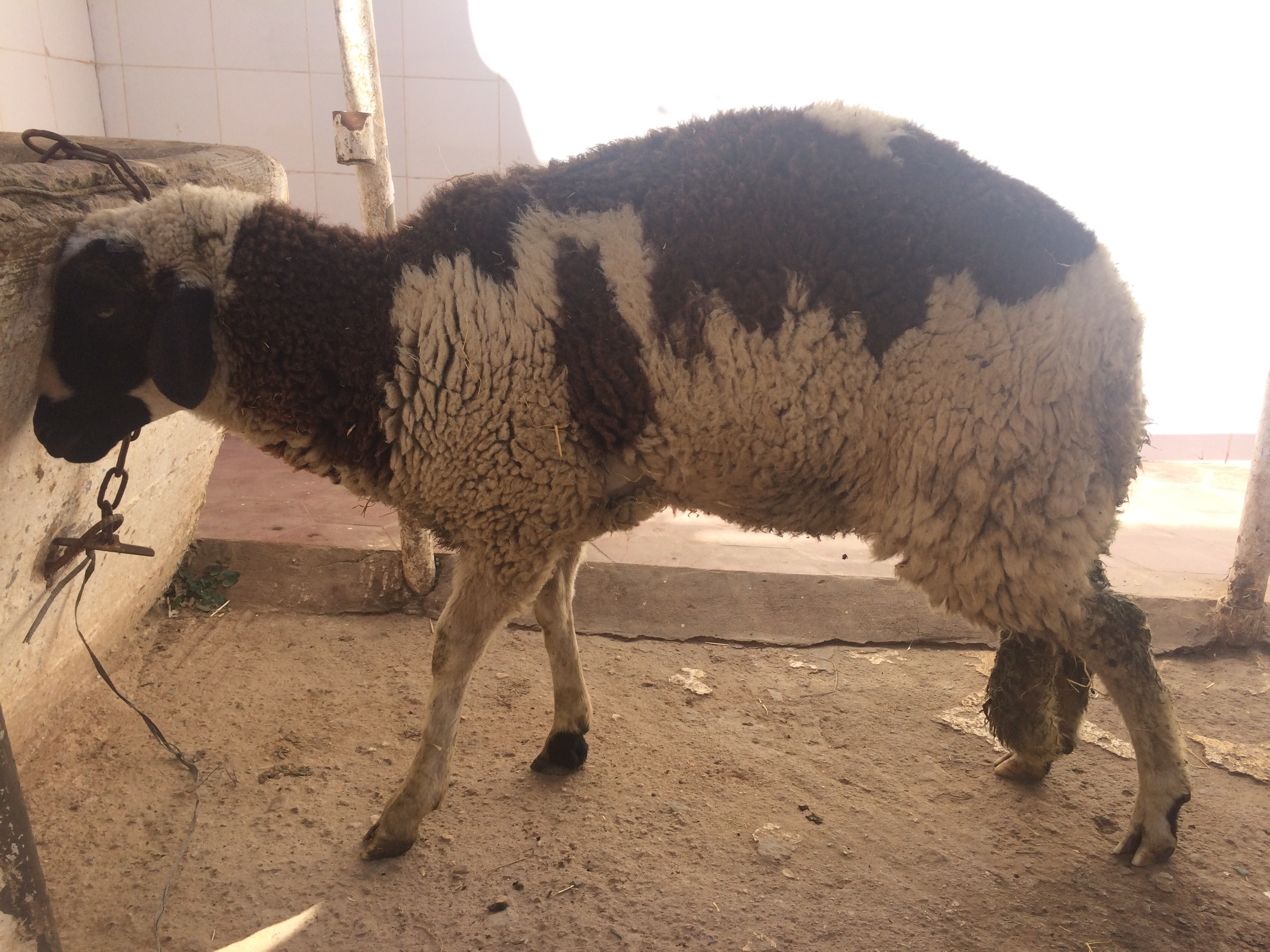
Head-pressing in sheep with polioencephalomalacia

Head pressing is a veterinary specific clinical sign characterized by pressing of the head against a wall or pushing the face into a corner for no apparent reason. This condition could be seen in dogs, cats, cows, horses, and goats.

Head pressing is usually a sign of a neurological disorder, especially of the forebrain (e.g., prosencephalon disease). The fore brain could be affected due to the primary disease of the brain itself (like brain fever) or due to brain toxicity from liver damage in conditions such as portosystemic shunt, this affection of the brain due to an advanced liver disease which is led from the inability of the liver to bind neurotoxins is called as hepatic encephalopathy.

Head pressing should be distinguished from bunting, which is a normal behavior found in healthy animals.

== Possible causes ==
There are many causes that can lead to the forebrain being affected, a veterinarian or a veterinary neurologist might perform diagnostics like CSF tap, MRI and Blood chemistry assessment to find out the cause, some of the causes are listed below:

- Prosencephalon disease
- Liver shunt
- Brain tumor
- Metabolic disorder (e.g., hyponatremia or hypernatremia)
- Stroke
- Infection of the nervous system (rabies, parasites, bacterial, viral or fungal infection)
- Head trauma
- Polioencephalomalacia in sheep

=== Liver neurotoxicity ===
A liver shunt is a congenital or acquired condition that may lead to toxicity and head pressing. Additional symptoms include drooling and slow maturation early in development. Middle-aged and older animals more commonly suffer from liver cirrhosis than younger animals.

=== Viral causes ===
Several viruses that cause encephalitis or meningoencephalitis can lead to the neurological sign of head pressing, such as eastern equine encephalitis and bovine herpesvirus 5.

== See also ==
- Bovine malignant catarrhal fever
- Canine brain tumors
