= Portosystemic shunts in animals =

Vascular anomaly in dogs and cats

Portosystemic shunts are a type of vascular abnormality that causes blood to be emptied into the circulation, without passing through the liver. This prevents the liver from detoxifying the blood. The condition may be either congenital or acquired.

== Classification ==
Portosystemic shunts are either congenital or acquired and some will be categorised as being either extraheptic or intraheptic.

== Aetiology ==
Intrahepatic shunts are caused by patent ductus venosus. The aetiology of extrahepatic shunts is complex and poorly understood.

== Symptoms ==
All forms of portosystemic shunts produce various neurological, gastrointestinal, and urinary symptoms.

Symptoms of congenital PSS usually appear by six months of age and include failure to gain weight, vomiting, and signs of hepatic encephalopathy (a condition where toxins normally removed by the liver accumulate in the blood and impair the function of brain cells) such as seizures, depression, tremors, drooling, and head pressing. Urate bladder stones may form because of increased amounts of uric acid in circulation and excreted by the kidneys.

Neurological symptoms include ataxia and seizure.

=== Risk factors ===
Irish Wolfhounds are predisposed to the condition with a digenic inheritance.

Extrahepatic shunts are more common in toy breeds whilst intrahepatic shunts are more common in large breeds.

== Pathology ==
Congenital PSS is caused by an anomaly in fetal liver circulatory system development. Normally, blood from the placenta bypasses the liver and goes into circulation via the ductus venosus, a blood vessel found in the fetus. A failure of the ductus venosus to close causes an intrahepatic shunt. On the other hand extrahepatic shunts usually result from a developmental abnormality of the vitelline veins, which connect the portal vein to the caudal vena cava. Thus in the juvenile and adult animal with PSS, blood from the intestines only partly goes through the liver, and the rest mixes into general circulation. Toxins such as ammonia are not cleared by the liver. Most commonly, extrahepatic shunts are found connecting the portal vein or left gastric vein to the caudal vena cava.

Congenital shunts are usually solitary. Acquired shunts are usually multiple, and are caused by portal hypertension in dogs with liver disease. This is most commonly seen in older dogs with cirrhosis, but may also be seen in younger dogs with liver fibrosis caused by lobular dissecting hepatitis.

== Diagnosis ==
Initial diagnosis of PSS is through laboratory bloodwork showing either elevated serum bile acids after eating or elevation of fasting blood ammonia levels, which has been shown to have a higher sensitivity and specificity than the bile acids test. Various diagnostic imaging techniques are used to demonstrate PSS. Ultrasonography is a rapid, convenient, non-invasive, and accurate method for diagnosis of PSS. Ultrasonographic diagnosis of congenital PSS depends on finding an anomalous vessel either in the liver or just caudal to the liver in the dorsal abdomen, usually draining into the caudal vena cava. Ultrasonography can also be used to estimate hepatic volume and vascularity, and to identify related lesions affecting other abdominal structures, such as urinary calculi. Computed tomography (CT) may be considered when ultrasound expertise is lacking or ultrasonography is considered sub-optimal (e.g. because of the conformation of the patient). Control of respiration and careful timing of CT acquisition after contrast injection is necessary for optimal depiction of PSS. Rectal portal scintigraphy using ^{99m}technetium pertechnetate, a technique of imaging involving detection of gamma rays emitted by radionuclides absorbed through the rectum and into the bloodstream, demonstrates the blood vessel bypassing the liver. In certain institutions, scintigraphy is the preferred diagnostic technique, but this leaves the patient radioactive for 24h, which may be inconvenient depending on nursing needs. Portal venography is the definitive method for demonstrating PSS, but is invasive, hence it is best reserved for animals with a known shunt or those considered highly likely to have a shunt that was not detectable by ultrasonography.

== Treatment ==
Surgical treatment is best, when it can be performed. Pressure within the portal vein is measured as the shunt is closed, and it must be kept below 20 cm H_{2}O or else portal hypertension will ensue. Methods of shunt attenuation should aim to slowly occlude the vessel over several weeks to months in order to avoid complications associated with portal hypertension. These methods include ameroid ring constrictors, cellophane banding, intravascular or percutaneous silicone hydraulic occluders. The most common methods of attenuation used by veterinarians are ameroid ring constrictors and cellophane banding. Both methods have reportedly good outcomes in both cats and dogs, although the true composition of readily sourced cellophane has been found to be made from plastics (inert) and not cellulose (stimulates a fibrous reaction). Recently, a commercial supplier of regenerated cellulose based cellophane for veterinarians has been established for use of cellophane banding for portosystemic shunts in dogs and cats. Complete closure of extrahepatic shunts results in a very low recurrence rate, while incomplete closure results in a recurrence rate of about 50 percent. However, not all dogs with extrahepatic shunts tolerate complete closure (16 to 68 percent). Intrahepatic shunts are much more difficult to surgically correct than extrahepatic shunts due to their hidden nature, large vessel size, and greater tendency toward portal hypertension when completely closed. When surgery is not an option, PSS is treated as are other forms of liver failure. Antibiotics such as neomycin or metronidazole and other medicines such as lactulose can reduce ammonia production and absorption in the intestines. The prognosis is guarded for any form of PSS.

== Genetics ==
The intrahepatic shunts found in large dog breeds are passed on in a simple autosomal recessive way. Extrahepatic shunts are believed to be a polygenic trait. It is not sex linked.
