= Congenital portosystemic shunt =

Liver bypass by the circulatory system

A portosystemic shunt or portasystemic shunt (medical subject heading term; PSS), also known as a liver shunt, is a bypass of the liver by the body's circulatory system. It can be either a congenital (present at birth) or acquired condition and occurs in humans as well as in other species of animals. Congenital PSS are extremely rare in humans but are relatively common in dogs. Improvements in imaging and awareness have contributed to an increase in cases Thus a large part of medical and scientific literature on the subject is grounded in veterinary medicine.

== Background ==
Blood leaving the digestive tract is rich in nutrients, as well as in toxins, which under normal conditions undergo processing and detoxification in the liver. The liver's position downstream to the intestines in the body's circulatory system - the hepatic portal vein conveys blood from the intestines to the liver - allows it to filter this nutrient rich blood before it passes to the rest of the body.

The presence of a shunt, a bypass of the liver, causes blood to flow directly to the heart. This blood is no longer filtered by the liver and reaches the systemic circulation, resulting in a number of symptoms and complications with effects on the cardiovascular, neurophysiological, gastro-intestinal, urinary and endocrinal systems.

Congenital porto-systemic shunts are vascular malformations which occur during the development of an organism in the uterus and are present at birth. In contrast, acquired porto-systemic shunts occur after birth and typically develop secondary to portal hypertension.

== Physiopathology ==
There are no major and direct communications between the portal and hepatic veins within the liver, nor between the systemic veins and the portal, superieur mesenteric or splenic veins. Two distinct systems provide the liver with blood. Oxygen rich blood is sent to the liver from the heart via the hepatic artery, while the portal vein brings nutrient rich (but depleted in oxygen) blood to the liver from the intestines. This blood passes by the network of capillaries before being evacuated by the hepatic veins into the inferior vena cava and subsequently the heart. The division between these two systems helps assure the liver's physiological roles.

A CPSS results in direct communication between the portal circulation and the systemic circulation. This breaks down the separation between these two systems which is crucial in ensuring normal physiological function. A reduction in the proportion of blood flowing from the digestive system to the liver during the first pass results. The coefficient of filtration is therefore reduced, less blood rich in nutrients and toxins is filtered, and an accumulation of toxins in the blood circulatory system occurs.

== Epidemiology ==
CPSS are thought to affect 1 in 30,000–50,000 live births. While most patients present with a single shunt, complex shunts, which include multiple abnormal vessels, are also reported.

== Clinical manifestation ==
The size of the liver in patients affected by PSS is typically 45% to 65% of the standard volume for a given age. Neonatal cholestasis, liver tumours, hepatopulmonary syndrome, pulmonary hypertension and encephalopathy are common clinical manifestations of CPSS. In adults, the discovery of a CPSS is often fortuitous but can also occur in response to the detection of one or several characteristic complications such as hepatic encephalopathy, hepatopulmonary syndrome and pulmonary hypertension. In children, CPSS may present as neonatal cholestasis. These complications are generally induced by long term portosystemic derivations and are more commonly observed in children than in adults. Unexplained neurocognitive dysfunction and other behavioural issues linked to hepatic encephalopathy occur in 17% to 30% of cases.

Gastrointestinal bleeding is another common complication of PSS and has been observed in 8.1% of patients with extrahepatic portosystemic shunts. Other complications of CPSS are hyperandrogenism, pancreatitis, vaginal bleeding, and lower urinary tract symptoms like nephrolithiasis (kidney stones) and haematuria (presence of blood in the urine). It is generally agreed amongst specialists that the majority of CPSSs should be closed by radiological or surgical intervention.

== Classification ==
Congenital porto-systemic shunts (CPSS) are classified occurring to the position of the anastomose. If the anastomosis occurs outside of the liver, the shunt is considered to be extrahepatic. On the other hand, if the anastomosis is located within the liver, it is considered to be intrahepatic. The clinical manifestations of intra- and extra- hepatic portal systemic shunts can be similar; however the pathophysiology and treatment of the two types are distinct.

== Treatment ==
Spontaneous closure of CPSS can occur in some anatomic forms during the first two year of life. However, in instances where spontaneous closure does not occur, radiologic or surgical closure of the CPSS is recommended to prevent, resolve and/or stabilise complications.

Upon discovery of a CPSS in a child, it is important to rule out portal hypertension or hepatic hemangioma as the cause of the shunt, either of which would require a specific treatment. Once the congenital, and isolated, nature of the shunt has been ascertained, closure by surgical intervention is usually recommended. Shunt closure prevents the development of complications in pre-symptomatic subjects and may reverse or stabilize signs and symptoms in patients.

== On-going research ==
An International Registry of Porto-Systemic Shunts (IRCPSS) has been elaborated in order to better understand the underlying causes, as well as the signs and symptoms of CPSS. The primary aim of the registry is to "better identify patients who are at risk of developing complications and to offer them standardized care."

== See also ==
- Portosystemic shunts in animals
