= Scent rubbing =

Behaviour where a mammal rubs its body against an object in their environment

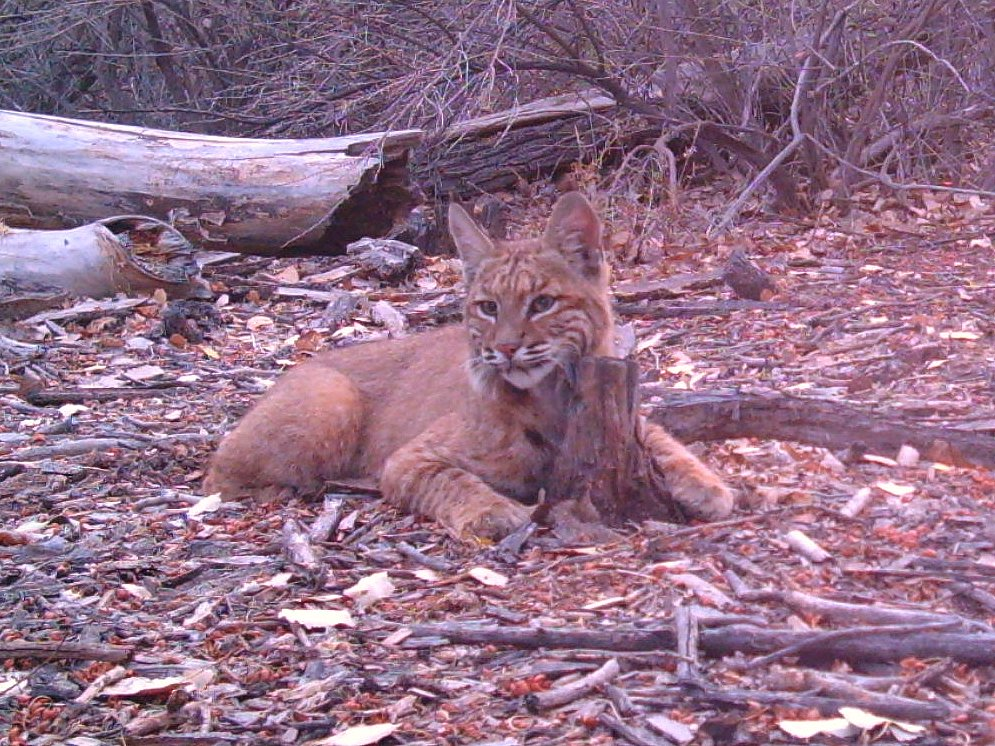
A bobcat (Lynx rufus) near a scent rubbing post. Bobcats display cheek rubbing to scent mark in the wild.

Scent rubbing is a behavior where a mammal rubs its body against an object in their environment, sometimes in ones covered with strongly odored substances. It is typically shown in carnivores, although many mammals exhibit this behavior. Lowering shoulders, collapsing the forelegs, pushing forward and rubbing the chin, temples, neck, or back is how this act is performed. A variety of different odors can elicit this behavior including feces, vomit, fresh or decaying meat, insecticide, urine, repellent, ashes, human food and so on. Scent rubbing can be produced by an animal smelling novel odors, which include manufactured smells such as perfume or motor oil and carnivore smells including feces and food smells.

Scent rubbing is often performed with scent marking and self-anointing, and is typically used by animals to scent mark an object in their surroundings. This marking can be used as a means of communication between species. Many different species of felids, monkeys, bears, wolves and marmots have primarily been used to study scent rubbing in carnivores. Differences in gender and age exist for scent rubbing, with adults and males performing the behavior more frequently than juveniles and females in many species.

== Species ==
=== Felidae ===
Many carnivorous felids scent rub. Felids are able to discriminate between similar smelling odors using the vomeronasal organ, which is important for eliciting scent rubbing. The rubbing behavior is often performed as a means of scent-marking.

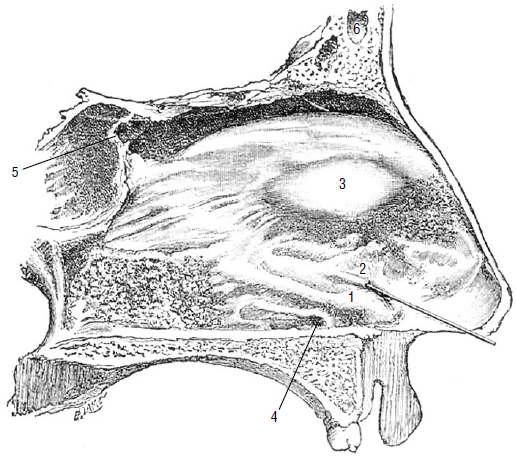
The opening of the vomeronasal organ, used by felids and other species to discriminate between different odours during scent rubbing.

==== Domestic cat ====
Domestic cats display scent rubbing. The cheeks, abdomen, paws, above tail and around the anus contain organs that produce scent. When a cat is comfortable with their surroundings and environment, they release the feline facial pheromone during facial rubbing in order to leave this pheromone on the objects around them. Cats scent rub against objects as a means of marking by releasing pheromones with glandular secretions, and information about the animal's age, sex, and identity can be obtained from these secretions.

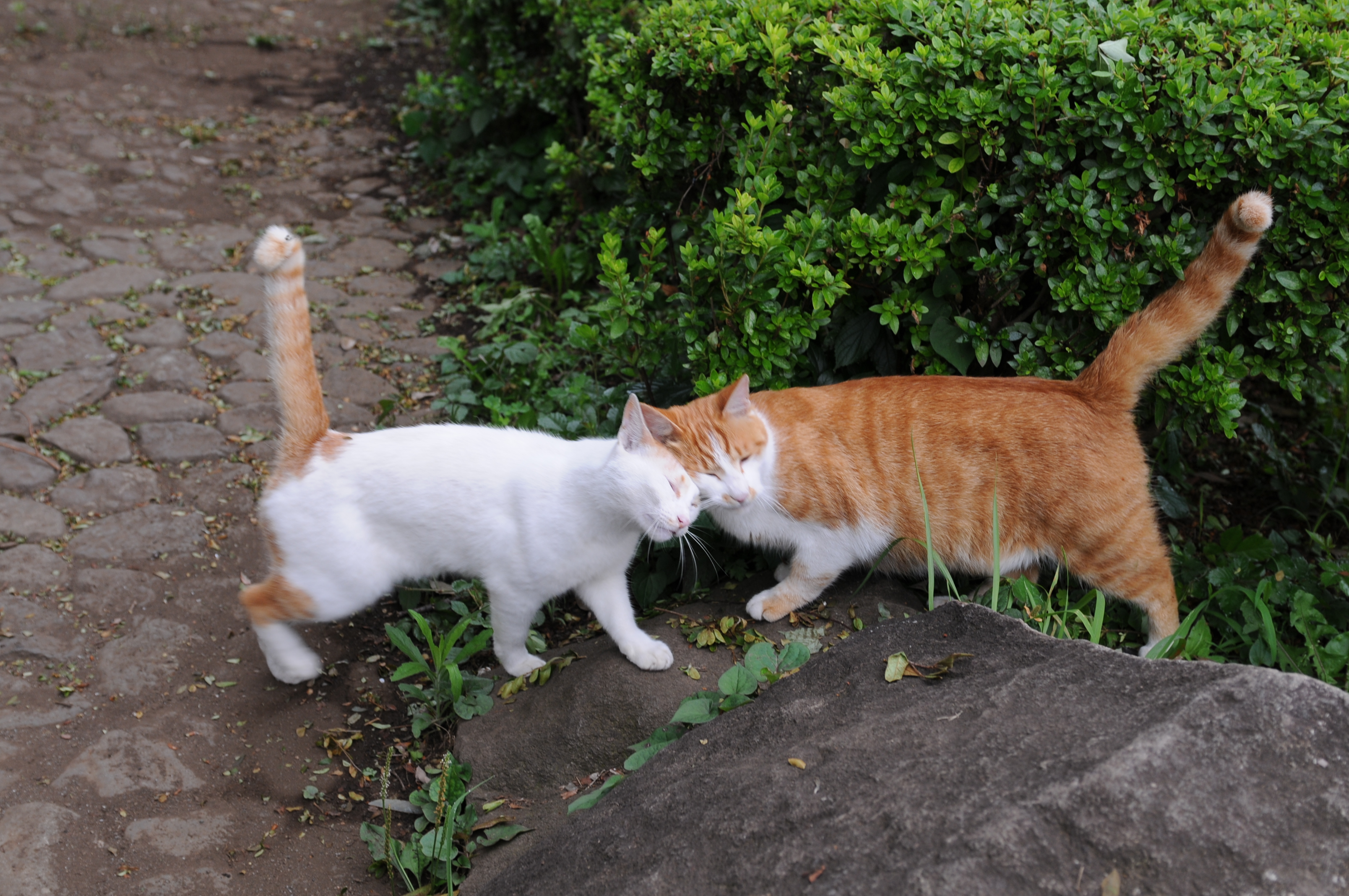
Two orange tabby Allorubbing

Domestic cats will more frequently rub against an object that is new to their environment. When an object is induced with the scent of another animal it causes an increase in rubbing as it contains sensory properties that are not familiar to the cat. When a cat is presented with an object treated with scent gland secretions from both a rat and snake, the cat will forcefully scent rub its head against it. This rubbing is called allorubbing, where cats rub not only their heads but also their sides,tails and ears against each other. This creates what's called a colony odor, alerting any other cats or animals of their affiliation.During rubbing against humans, cats tend to use the temporal gland area which consists of the cheek, between the eye and the ear.

==== Leopard ====
Kalahari leopards use trees in their environment to scent rub. When the backs and flanks are rubbed against trees it is most often related to itching rather than scent rubbing, but when rubbing to scent mark is used it is mostly demonstrated by males when mating. It is suggested that this rubbing behavior is a form of chemical communication regarding female attention.

=== Bears ===
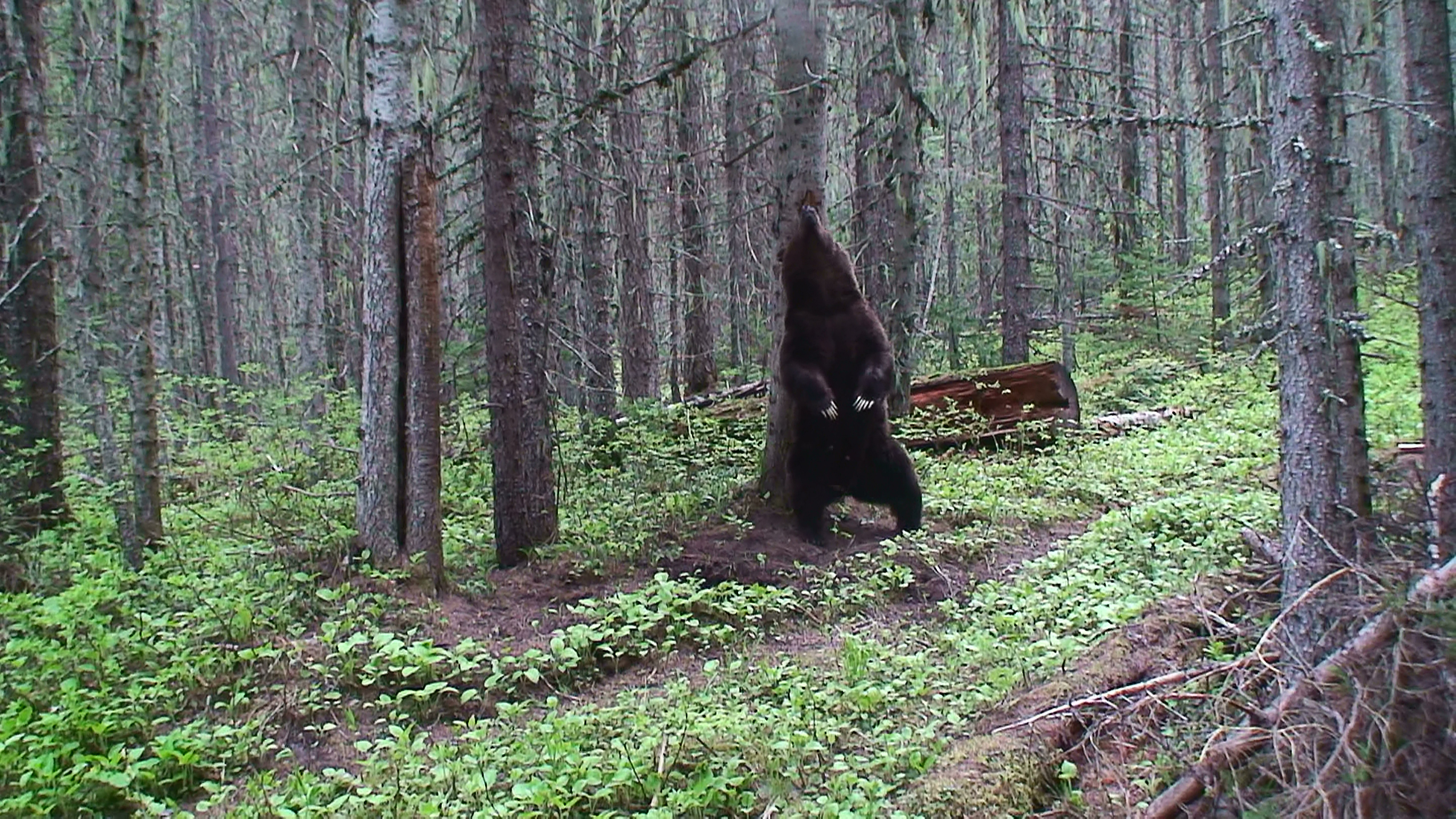
A grizzly bear rubbing a tree

Bears rub against the ground, trees and rocks in order to scent mark. This is the most frequent way that bears mark their surroundings. Black bears rub their cheeks, back, neck and head against trees in a bipedal stance. This act is noted most often during the breeding season for grizzly and black bears as a form of communication. The behavioral aspect of scent rubbing is shown during interspecific interactions between these bears, as black bears are found to decrease their tree rubbing once a grizzly has already done so. The Andean bear scent rubs against trees at marking sites by rubbing its neck, shoulders, flanks or back. Sometimes this species marks the tree with its claws or urinates while rubbing. The behavior in this species is thought to be linked to intraspecific communication. This communication lets other bears know whose territory it is.

=== New World monkeys ===
The rubbing behaviors of the Southern brown howler monkeys are linked to scent marking. Throat (facial and neck), anal, dorsal, chest and chin rubbing has been observed in Alouatta and is mostly performed while sitting. Like felids, howler monkeys use their vomeronasal sensory organs to distinguish pheromones. Dominant howlers of both male and female genders scent rub and mark more than subordinate conspecifics. Anogenital rubbing in monkeys is associated with cleaning after defecation and urination and also deposits the animals scent for other species to notice.

Black-handed spider monkeys are another Atelidae species which display fur rubbing against the leaves of Rutaceae plants. Their scent rubbing behaviour resembles those shown by white-faced capuchins, often done by many individuals simultaneously, creating an interaction among their population and may function in scent marking and olfactory communication. Woolly monkeys also show scent rubbing in the form of chest rubbing that suggests the behaviour has a reproductive function. The reasoning for chest rubbing in woolly monkeys is similar to the throat rubbing displayed by howler monkeys during mating season. Rubbing behaviour in woolly monkeys has also been linked to dominance and social communication.

=== Gray wolf ===
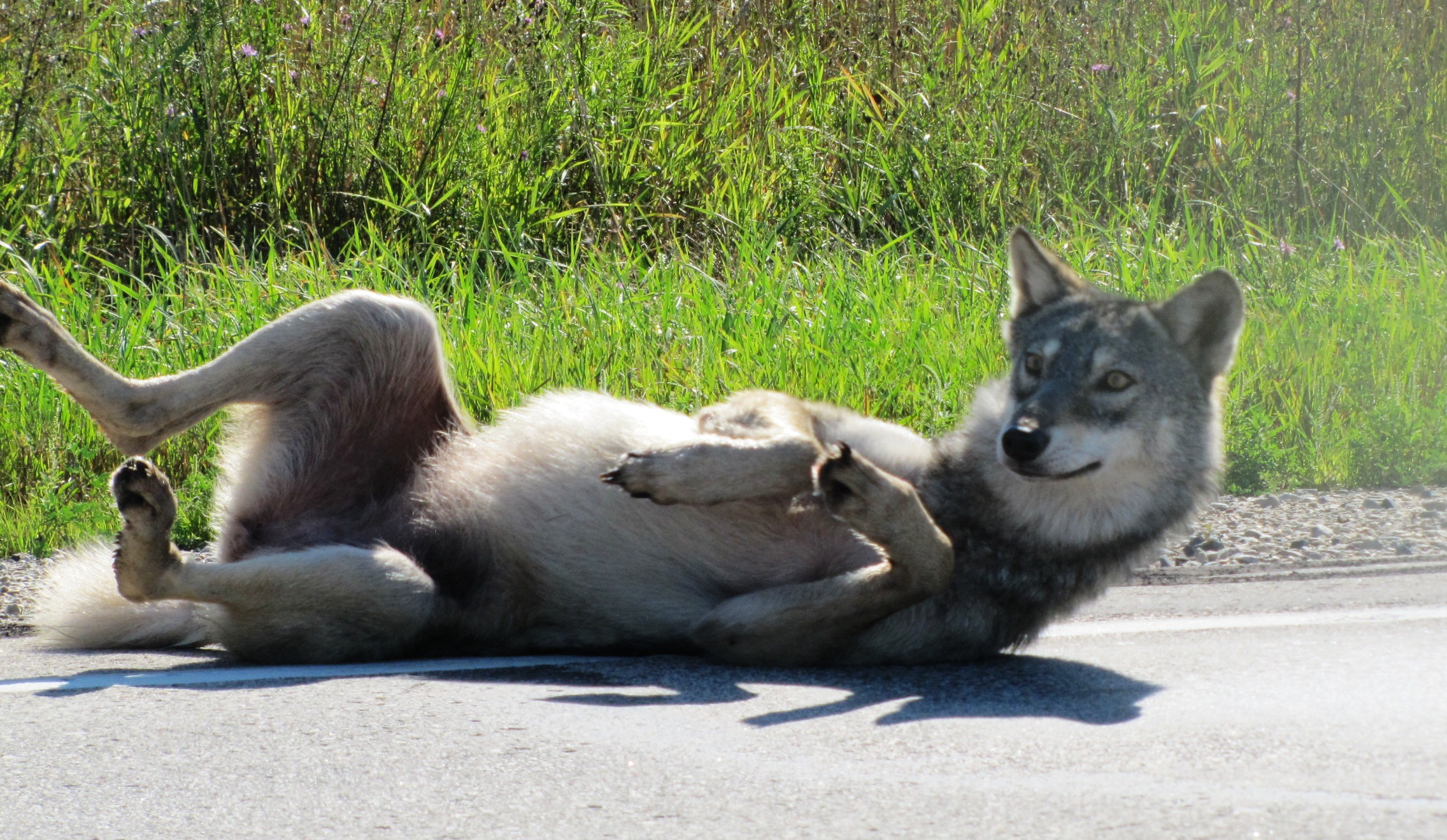
Female Gray Wolf Scent Rubbing

Gray wolves scent rub to a large variety of odors including urine, perfumes, repellant, ashes, human handled objects, food, and resting sites. They scent rub intensively to manufactured smells such as motor oil and carnivore scents such as feces of other animals including black bear and cougars. The reason behind scent rubbing in wolves is unknown, but it is suggested that they use it to remember odors experienced in their environment, whether new or familiar.Another reason that has been hypothesised for scent rolling in wolves is communication. Researchers have suggested that wolves may rub against certain scents, such as animal carcasses, to communicate information about food sources to fellow pack members. This theory is based on observations of other animals, such as gray foxes, rubbing against predator scents, potentially to deter predators.

=== Marmot ===
Marmots slowly rub their faces from mouth to ears on objects repeatedly as a form of scent rubbing called cheek rubbing. This behavior is common, and the objects are typically stones, rocks and the ground around burrows. They conduct this behavior to scent mark, and when interrupted fights can occur. Marmots scent rub on new objects within their home environment.

== Communication ==
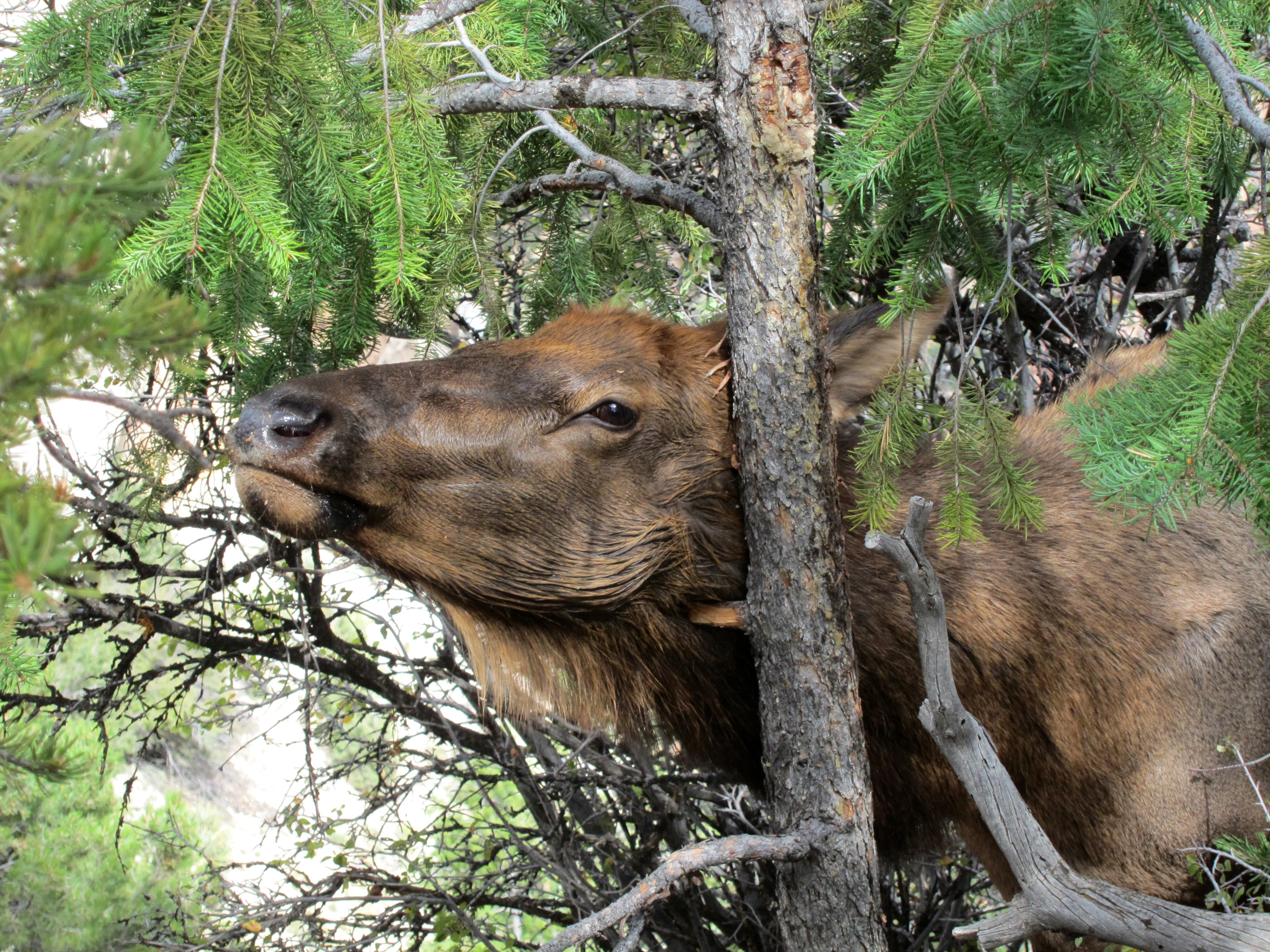
An elk rubbing a tree

Scent rubbing can be used as a form of communication between many terrestrial mammals. This method is used to send messages, find mates and to keep away from areas where others have foraged. Odours produced by sweat glands, urine, feces and vaginal secretions often induce this behavior, which is prominent in carnivore species. Scent rubbing by males in many species is related to intrasexual communication and social interaction, such as the social status the animal holds in that population. Carnivores often scent rub as a mechanism of olfactory communication in which they release chemical odours to increase odds of being detected by conspecifics.

Spider monkeys rub saliva onto their sternal region and then rub this area against a tree, which may serve as a form of olfactory communication as they often use their apocrine glands, located in the sternal area, for this communication. Rubbing behavior displayed through cheek rubbing can reveal dominance in a population, with subordinate individuals doing this less than dominant ones. Scent rubbing also allows animals to gather scent from their surroundings onto themselves. Gray foxes have been found to cheek rub fresh puma scrapes in order to acquire the scent and mask their own, deterring predation by other animals. This shows that scent rubbing has an interspecific scent marking function.

== Odours that induce rubbing ==
Odors can have an array of different chemical compounds within them.Both naturally strong occurring and artificial substances carry chemical information that can cause mammals to scent rub depending on their source. Strong smelling substances include rotting meat, fresh meat, vomit, faeces, food and the intestinal contents of other animals. Artificial substances that induce this behaviour include engine oil, perfume and insecticide. When an animal encounters an object with a novel or familiar smell it can elicit rubbing various body parts against this object. The presence of a certain chemical compound in an odor does not necessarily mean that it causes a specific behavioral response. Researchers have yet to distinguish between chemicals present in a scent and those that have been proven to directly influence an animal's behavior.

== Urban Scent Rubbing ==
There are differences between scent rubbing in urban and natural environments. In natural environments, animals encounter odors from vegetation, prey, predators, and other wildlife, while animals in urban environments encounter a variety of other scents from humans, garbage, food waste, perfumes, and artificial substances. All these differences can affect what odors animals choose to rub against. Urban environments are far more high-traffic when it comes to human disturbances, so many animals adjust their activity patterns to avoid encounters with them. A study done in Tokyo with raccoon dogs found that they visited communal scent-marking areas mostly at night. However, scent marking is different from scent rubbing, and more research is needed to determine how urban environments specifically affect scent-rubbing behavior.

== Sex and age differences ==
=== Sex ===
The scent rubbing behavior has been observed more frequently in males than females for many species. Certain male domestic cats, bears, monkeys and leopards are shown to scent rub more than their female conspecifics. There is an increase of scent rubbing during breeding season for black bears, but this is done predominantly by males. Body rubbing as a means of scent marking is done more often by male pumas. In species of spider monkey, adult males perform fur rubbing more often than females.

=== Age ===
Scent rubbing in cats is performed by adult animals more often than juveniles, indicating that the behaviour is used as a means of marking territory or of expressing their status. Adult marmots display a form of scent rubbing called cheek rubbing more than young members of the species. Mature pumas spent a significantly longer time body rubbing than immature pumas, which is related to communication behaviours developing with age, mature females did not visit their community scrapes as often. Only sexually mature woolly monkeys exhibit chest rubbing, which suggests that this scent rubbing behaviour reproductive function.
