= Aggression in cattle =

Aggression in cattle is usually a result of fear, learning, and hormonal state, however, many other factors can contribute to aggressive behaviors in cattle.

Despite the fact that bulls (uncastrated male cattle) are generally significantly more aggressive than cows, there are far more reported cases of cows attacking humans than bulls, and the majority of farm-related injuries and fatalities by cattle is caused by cows. This is most likely due to the fact that there are far more female cattle on a farm than bulls, so statistically the likelihood of injury or death from cattle is more likely to be caused by cows. However, this is also exacerbated by the fact that many people are unaware of the potential for aggression in cows, especially during, and immediately after, calving (giving birth) and when cows feel threatened or are seeking to protect their young.

== Temperament traits ==
Temperament traits are known to be traits which explain the behavior and actions of an animal and can be described in the traits responsible for how easily an animal can be approached, handled, milked, or trained. Temperament can also be defined as how an animal carries out maternal or other behaviors while subjected to routine management. These traits have the ability to change as the animal ages or as the environment in which the animal lives changes over time, however, it is proven that regardless of age and environmental conditions, some individuals remain more aggressive than others. Aggression in cattle can arise from both genetic and environmental factors.

Aggression between cows is worse than that between bulls. Bulls with horns will bunt (push or strike with the horns) in which can cause more damage overall. In humans, most aggressive behaviors of cows include kicking, crushing and/or bunting.

== Types of aggression ==
There are many types of aggression that are seen in animals, particularly cattle, including maternal, feed, comfort influencing, pain induced, and stress induced aggressiveness.

=== Maternal aggression ===
There are many components to maternal behavior that are seen in cattle, including behavior that allows proper bonding between mother and baby, nursing behavior, attentiveness and how mother responds to offspring. This maternal behavior is often seen in cattle during lactation as a prey species, this triggers the maternal instinct to protect their young from any threat and may use violent aggressive behaviors as a defense mechanism. During lactation in prey species, including cattle, a reduction in fear responsiveness of the dam to novel and potentially dangerous situations facilitates the expression of defensive aggression in protection of the young. It has also been proven however that aggression is not only performed in the protection of the offspring, but it can be directed to the offspring, in which could be directly related to fear.

=== Feed aggression ===
This is commonly seen in cattle due to high stocking densities which could potentially decrease the amount of space each cow has, as well as limit their ability to have access to feed, even impacting the ruminal environment. It is proven that supplying feed and water to cattle that are housed together may be heavily associated with feed aggression and aggressive actions towards other cows and within loose-housed cattle, feeding places are noted to have the highest amount of aggressive behaviors.

=== Comfort induced aggression ===
These are aggressive behaviors associated with lack of comfort, inadequate lying space or time in which the physical environment fails to provide the animal. Cow comfort plays an important role in the well being as well as maximizing production as an industry. Within many intensive production systems, it is very common to see limited space for resting, which can be associated with negative behaviors as not providing the appropriate space for the animal reduces resting and lying behavior, increasing irritability and the potential to act in aggressive behaviors. Although not all production systems provide limited space and time for lying, uncomfortable stalls are also known to be a major problem when it comes to lying behavior in cattle. Decreasing the quality of resting area for cows will decrease resting time, and increase the likelihood of stress, abnormal and aggressive behaviors as the deprivation of lying/resting behaviors is proven to affect responses within the hypothalamic pituitary adrenal axis which is associated with chronic stress in the animal. Not only lying time and space act as important regulators of comfort induced aggression, but other environmental factors may play a role in the comfort of an animal. Temperature has been shown to be a factor that influences the behavioral interactions between cattle, and it has been found that, by providing cows with the proper cooling environment or as heat could decrease aggressive interactions as cattle will have been shown to engage in aggressive behavior in order to gain access to a shaded and cattle with access to more shade are known to show reduced physiological and behavioral responses to heat.

=== Stress induced aggression ===
A stressor is an object or event that can cause a real or perceived threat internally or externally to an animal. Stressors are common in farm animals such as dairy cows as they live in a complex environment where there are many stressors including novel objects (new objects such as handlers, food, or group mates), social stimuli (different environments, new individuals), or restraint (physical restraint, moved to cubicles, transported).

Dairy cows specifically have been known to be very sensitive to new, unfamiliar events or objects such as being around an unfamiliar person, or presented with a novel food item.

Stress has extreme negative impacts on growth and reproduction in cattle, as the pituitary-adrenal system is very sensitive to different environmental stressors such as inadequate space, feed, poor quality housing, new objects or individuals, or new living/housing system.

=== Pain induced aggression ===
Pain is defined as an affective state and can only be truly measured indirectly in both humans and animals. Many common medical interventions and diseases can result in pain in cattle, such as dehorning, tail docking, handling, castrating, mastitis, lameness, confinement, and transportation.

Lameness is an especially common abnormality in cattle, presenting within 8% of pasture-reared herds and up to 55% of indoor herds. Hoof lesions are the cause of 70-90% of reported cases of lameness. The condition occurs or worsens in facilities with poor management, sanitation, and housing systems. It is because of this issue that many cows find themselves spending a lot of time lying down, instead of engaging in both aggressive (head butting, vocalizing, pushing) and non aggressive behaviors (licking, walking) due to the pain.

== Preventions ==
Techniques such as low stress handling (LSH) can be used as it provides silence, adequate restraint methods can help minimize stress levels in the animals. Flight zones should be considered when handling or moving cattle, as they have a blind spot and may get spooked easily if unaware if there is an individual around. Providing environments for cows in which minimize any environmental stressor can not only improve the wellbeing and welfare of the animal, but can also reduce aggressive behaviors.

Regular examinations (physical and physiological) should be done to determine the condition of the cow, which could show signs of cuts, or lesions, as well as the secretion or hormones inside the body such as cortisol. Cortisol can be measured through blood sampling, urine, saliva or heart rate to indicate stress level of animal.

Assessing for lameness, as well as giving proper treatment depending on severity/location can include antibiotics, Using proper treatment/prevention for pain when lameness is examined, as well as procedures such as tail docking, dehorning, castrating, mastitis lameness etc.

The primary treatment in lame cows is corrective hoof pairing, which provides draining of abscesses, fixing any structural issue with the hoof, and reducing weight baring problems, however if lesions are seen in cattle, antibiotics or other measures may have to be taken to reduce further infection/irritation.

Setting breeding goals can be a potential way to select for desired temperamental traits, further decreasing the risk of raising aggressive cattle. Before this method of selection can be entirely accurate and safe, however, some tests should be done, such as behavior and temperament tests.
