= Polioencephalomalacia =

Animal disease

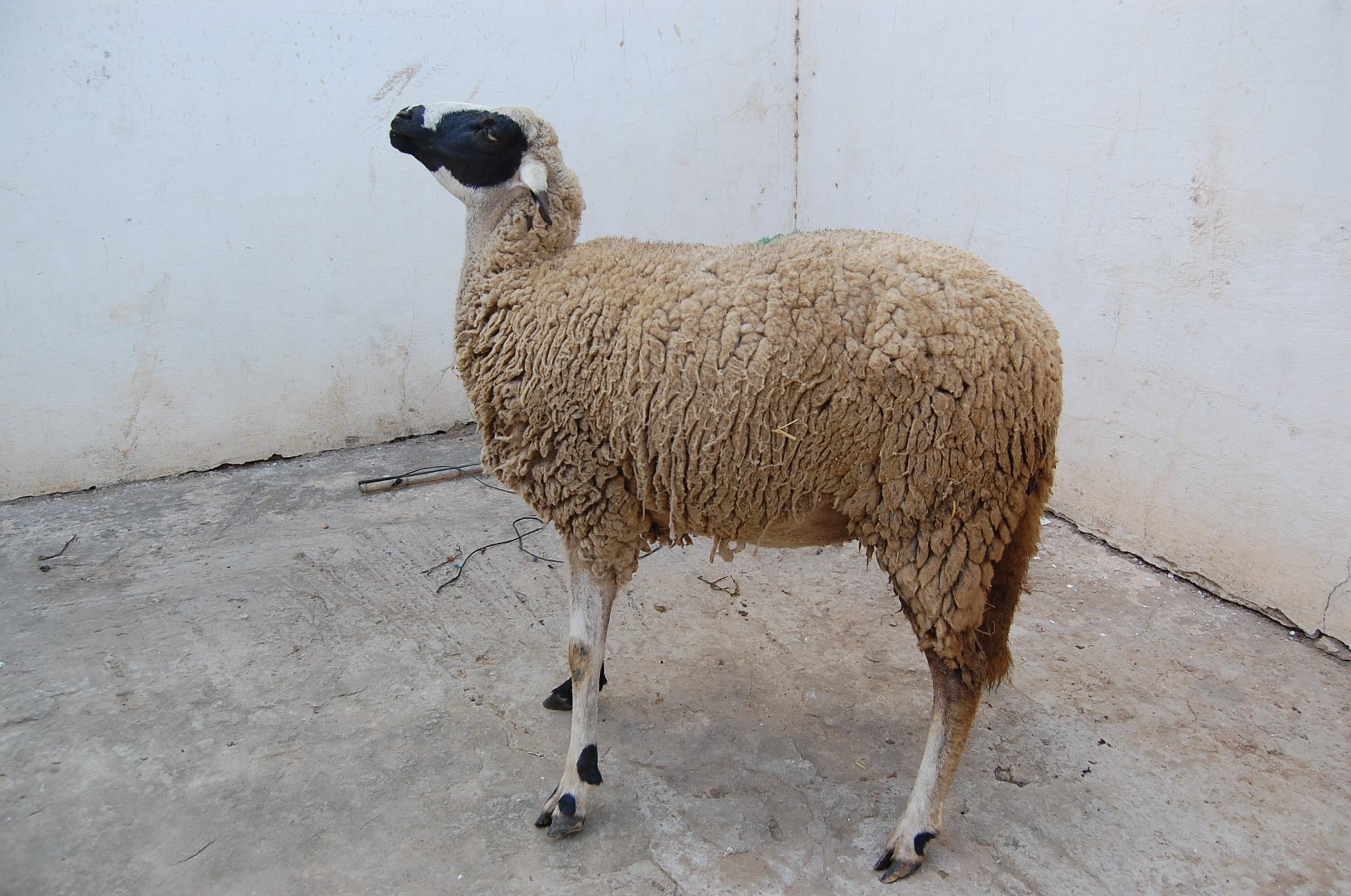
"Star-gazing" ewe with PEM

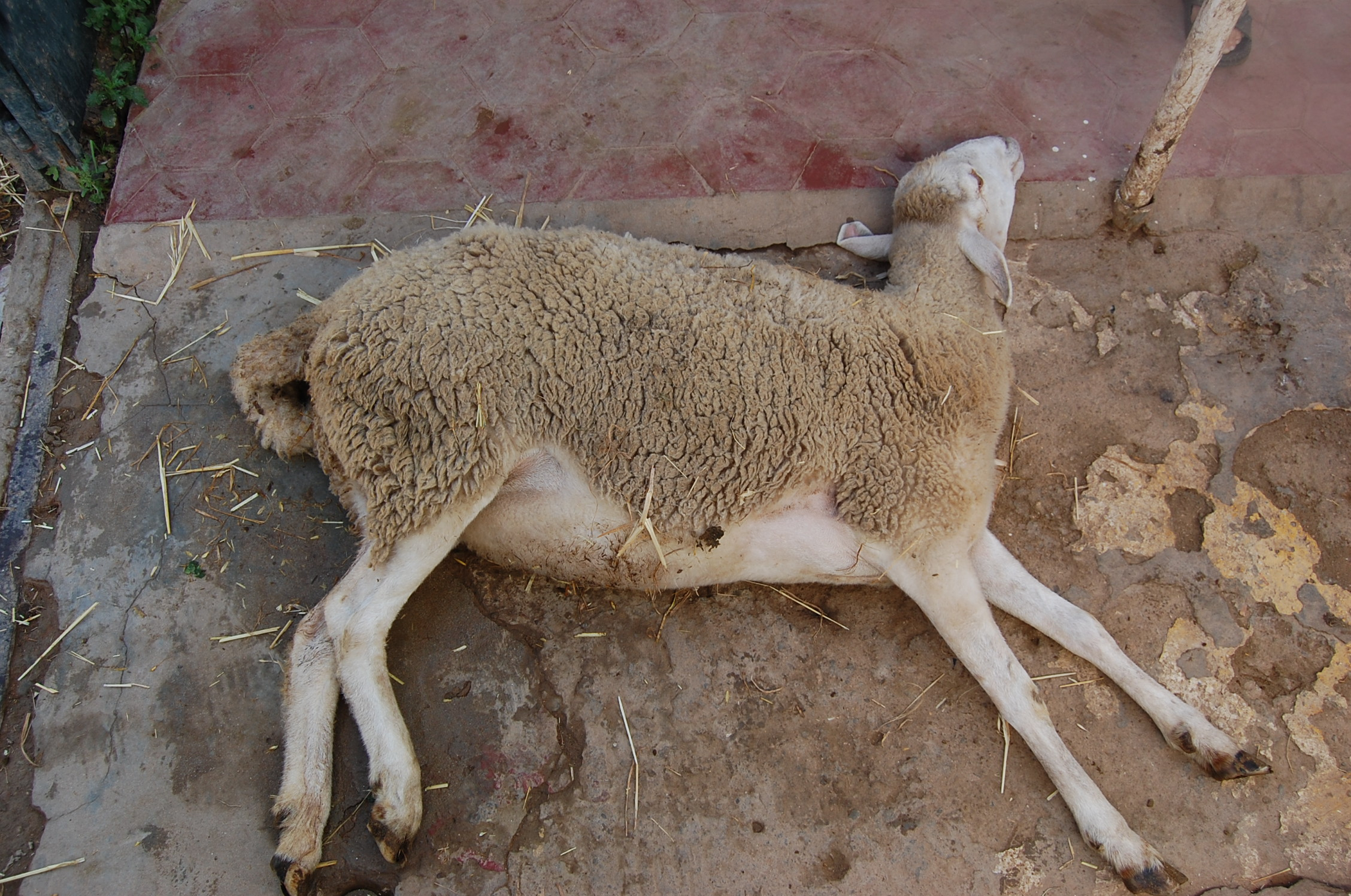
lateral recumbency and opisthotonos

Polioencephalomalacia (PEM), also referred to as cerebrocortical necrosis (CCN), is a neurological disease seen in ruminants that is caused by multiple factors, one of which is thiamine depletion in the body. Thiamine (vitamin B1) is a key chemical in glucose metabolism that, when deficient, is most threatening to neurological activity. In addition to altered thiamine status, an association with high sulfur intake has been observed as a potential cause of PEM. PEM may also be caused by other toxic or metabolic diseases such as: acute lead poisoning or salt poisoning. Cattle, sheep, goats, and other ruminants that are diagnosed with PEM or pre-PEM suffer opisthotonus, cortical blindness, disoriented movement, and eventually fatality, if left untreated. Current data shows that the onset of PEM can range from birth to late adulthood.

== Causes ==
=== Thiamine deficiency ===
Thiamine availability is controlled by the direct dietary consumption of thiamine. Thiamine availability is also regulated by thiaminases, which are enzymes that readily cleave thiamine molecules and inhibit essential thiamine-regulated pathways such as the metabolism of glucose. Ruminants have working rumen microbes that synthesize thiamine molecules for the body; therefore, ruminants do not need to ingest thiamine rich foods for thiamine. However, feed concentrates given to ruminants, specifically sheep and cattle, are often heavily stocked with thiaminases. The presence of thiaminases counter the production of thiamine by breaking them down, resulting in a futile cycle between rumen microbes and thiaminases. Eventually, when the rate of synthesis production can not exceed thiaminase intake, a state of thiamine deficiency will be reached. Thiaminase rich feeds include different grains, fresh water fish, and ferns, all of which are often processed together to make feed concentrate.

=== Overconsumption of glucose ===
Since glucose metabolism is regulated by thiamine, the overconsumption of glucose can also result in thiamine inadequacy. When there is a sudden increase of glucose in the body, thiamine will be depleted so that thiamine is not available when the next round of glucose needs to be metabolized.

=== High sulfur intake ===
Research has also shown that high concentrations of sulfur intake may be for PEM. Sulfur is necessary for the synthesis of important sulfur-containing amino acids and their contribution to the synthesis of different hormones, enzymes, and structural proteins. The ruminant diet, especially that of cattle, can be overly concentrated with sulfur. In ruminants, the same rumen microbes that generate thiamine molecules reduce sulfur into toxic sulfides. Among the sulfide toxins is hydrogen sulfide, a gas compound that will compete with oxygen to bind with red blood cells and eventually enter the brain to disrupt neural activity.

== Clinical signs ==
Clinical signs of PEM are variable depending on the area of the cerebral cortex affected and may include head pressing, dullness, opisthotonos, central blindness, anorexia, muscle tremors, teeth grinding, trismus, salivation, drooling, nystagmus, clonic convulsions, and recumbency. Early administration of thiamine may be curative, but if the lesion is more advanced, then surviving animals may remain partially blind and mentally dull.

== See also ==
- Cortical laminar necrosis
