= Cephalic index in cats and dogs =

Skull shapes of cats and dogs

The cephalic index of a vertebrate is the ratio between the width (side to side) and length (front to back) of its cranium (skull). This ratio does not concern the muzzle or face, and thus is distinct from the craniofacial ratio, which compares the size of the cranium to the length of the muzzle. The two measures are often confused in descriptions of dog breeds.

The cephalic index is used to classify animals into three groups:

Brachycephalic (literally 'short-headed'): the length of the cranium is shorter than the width, giving the top and sides of the cranium a round shape, often referred to as 'apple-head'. Brachycephalic breeds in domestic animals are the result of severe artificial selection, most prominently exemplified in dog breeds. Brachycephalic dog breeds tend to suffer from unique health problems associated with brachycephalic obstructive airway syndrome (BOAS) such as overheating, chronic hypoxia, and obesity. Brachycephalic dogs include the pug, boxer, and bulldog while brachycephalic cats include the British shorthair and Exotic shorthair.

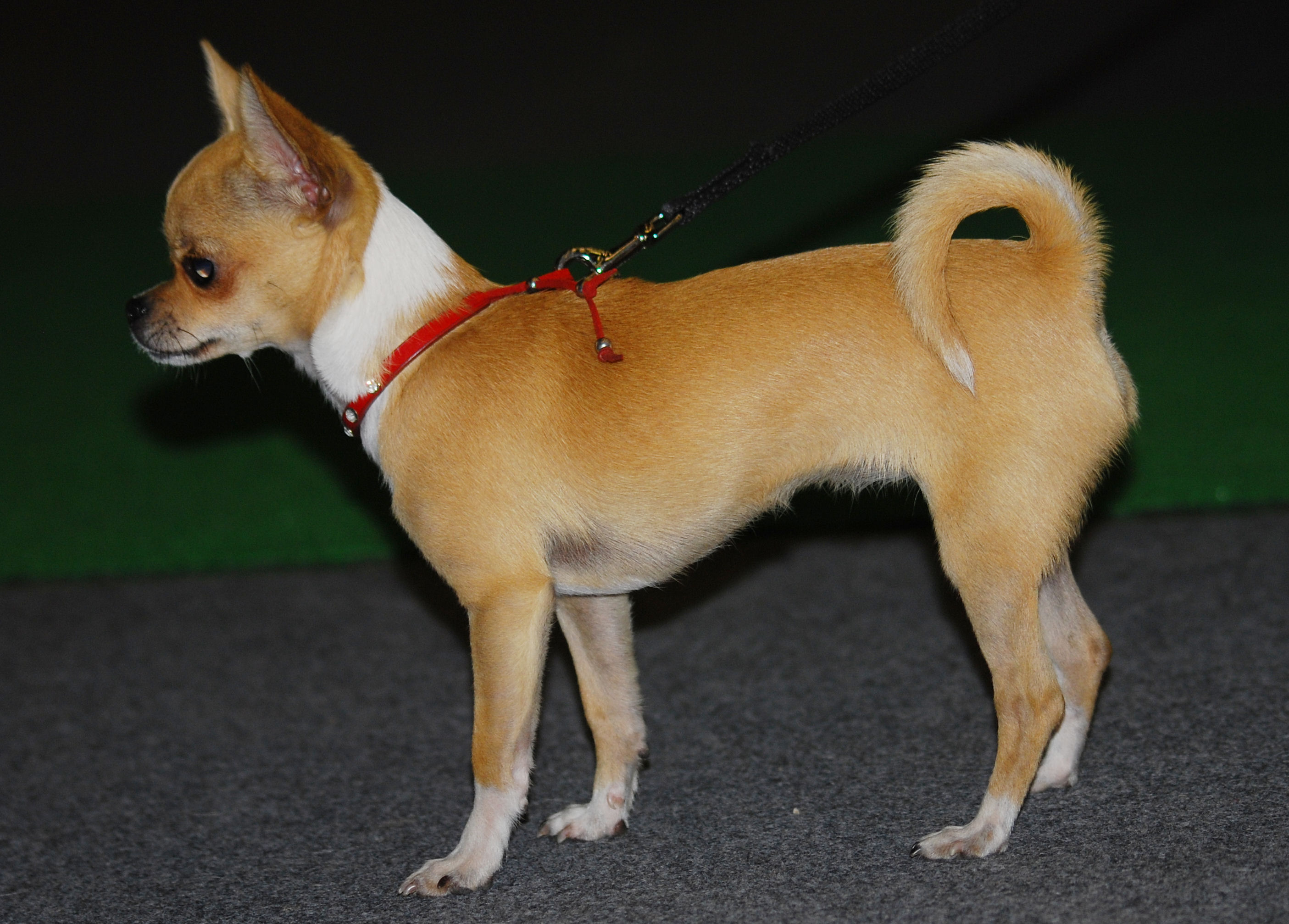

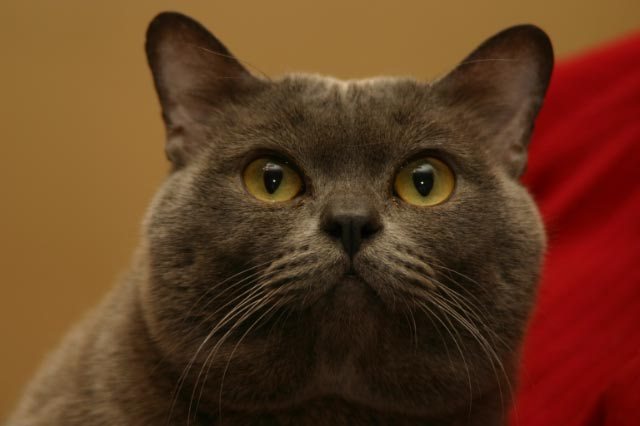

Mesaticephalic or mesocephalic ('middle-headed'): the length and width are equal, giving a square shape. When dealing with animals, especially dogs, the more appropriate and commonly used term is not "mesocephalic", but rather "mesaticephalic", which is a ratio of head to nasal cavity. Mesaticephalic dog breeds are the result of intermediate artificial selective pressure while the ancestral cat was considered to be mesaticephalic. Mesaticephalic dogs include golden retrievers and Labrador retrievers while mesaticephalic cats include the American shorthair.

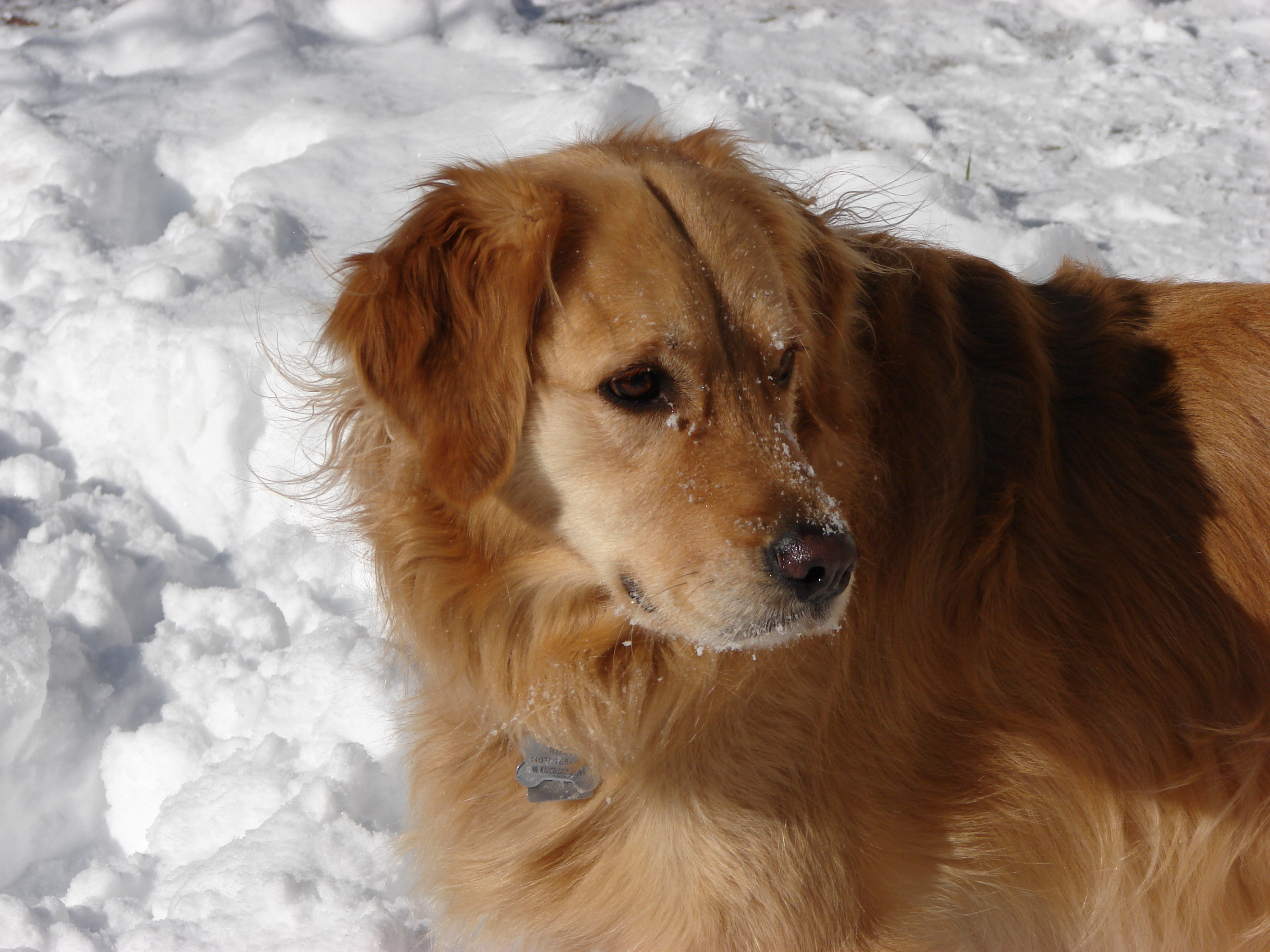

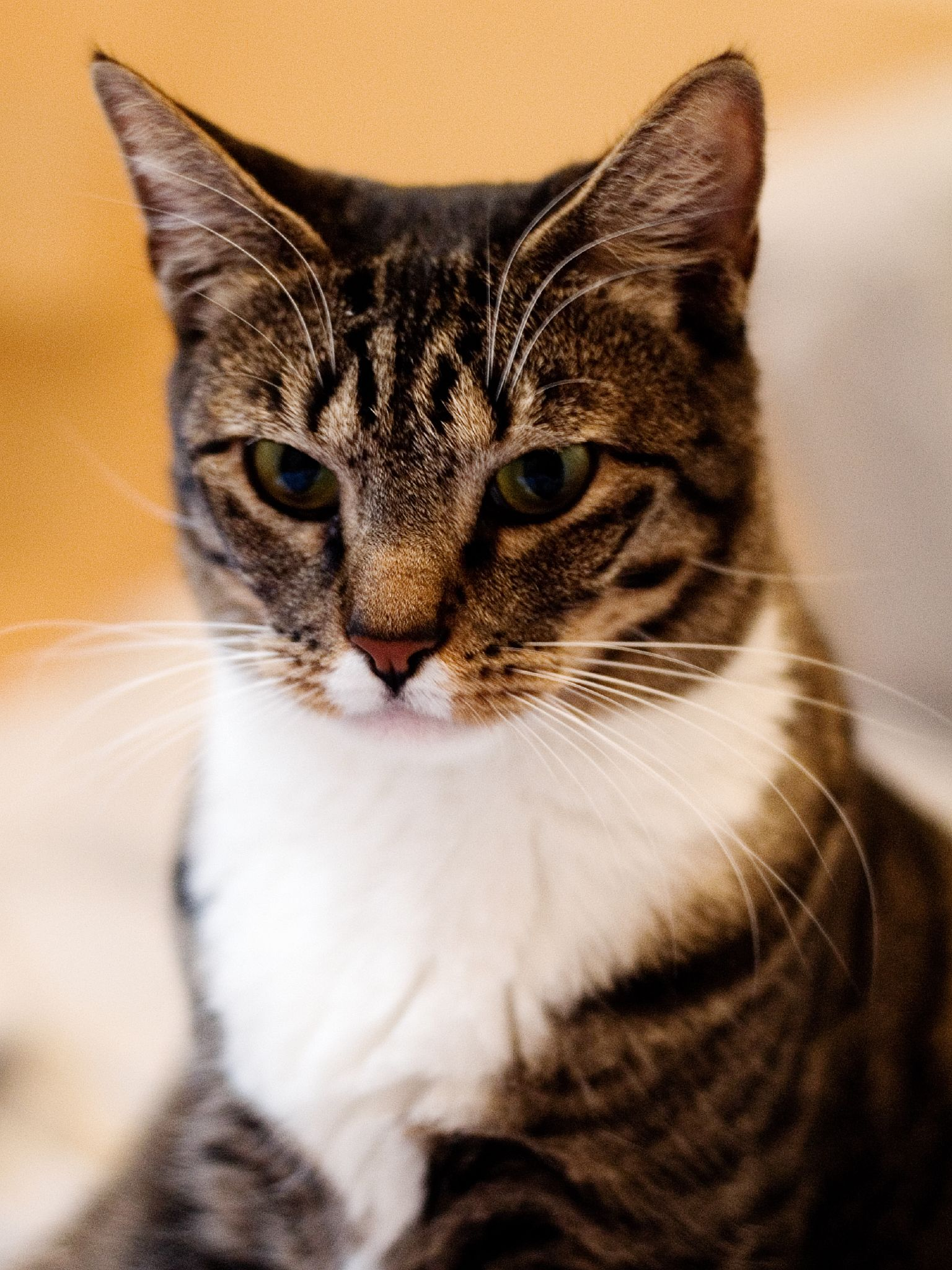

Dolichocephalic ('long-headed): the length is greater than the width. The ancestral dog was considered to be dolichocephalic. Dolichocephalic dogs include the greyhound and borzoi while dolichocephalic cats include Siamese.

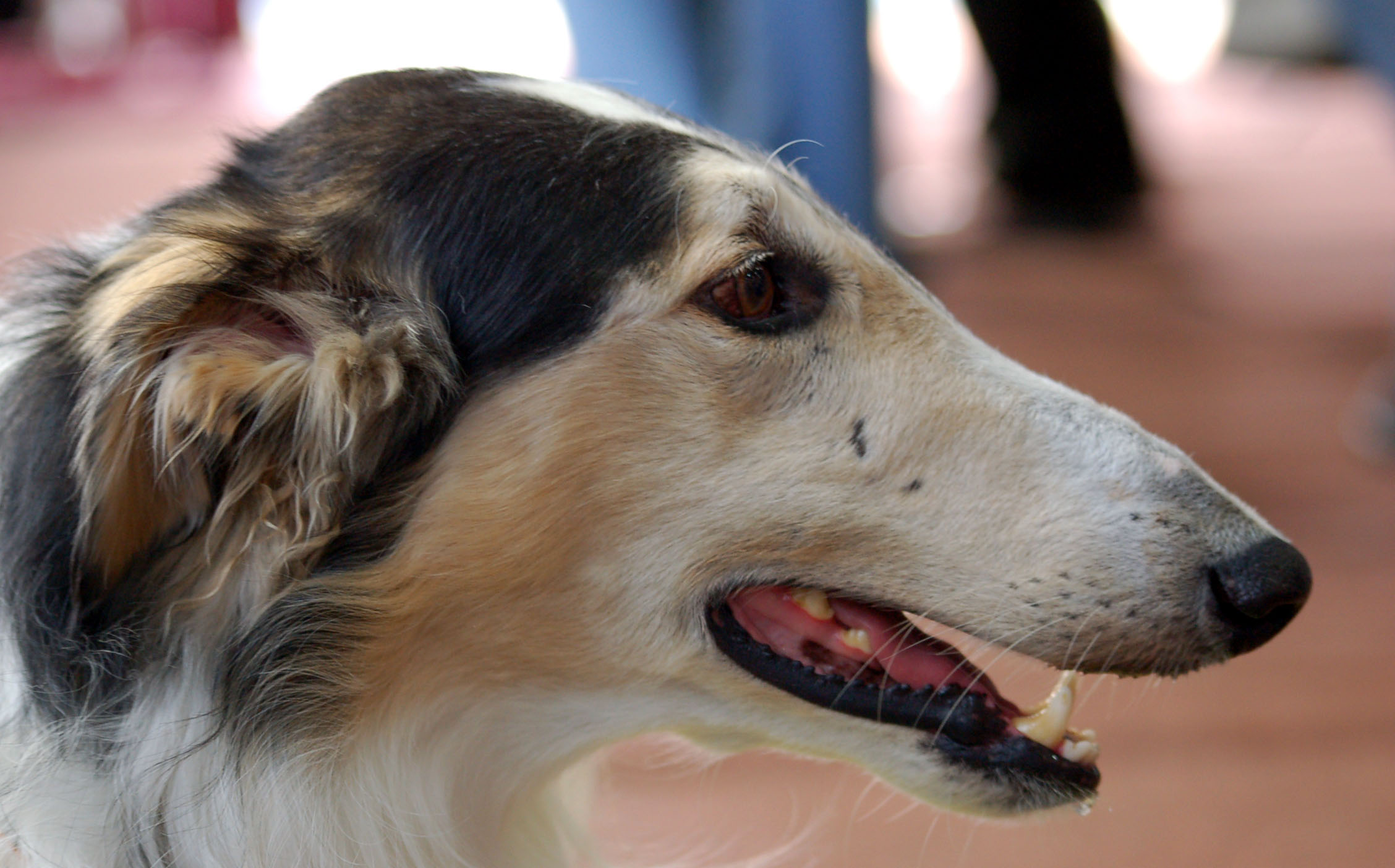

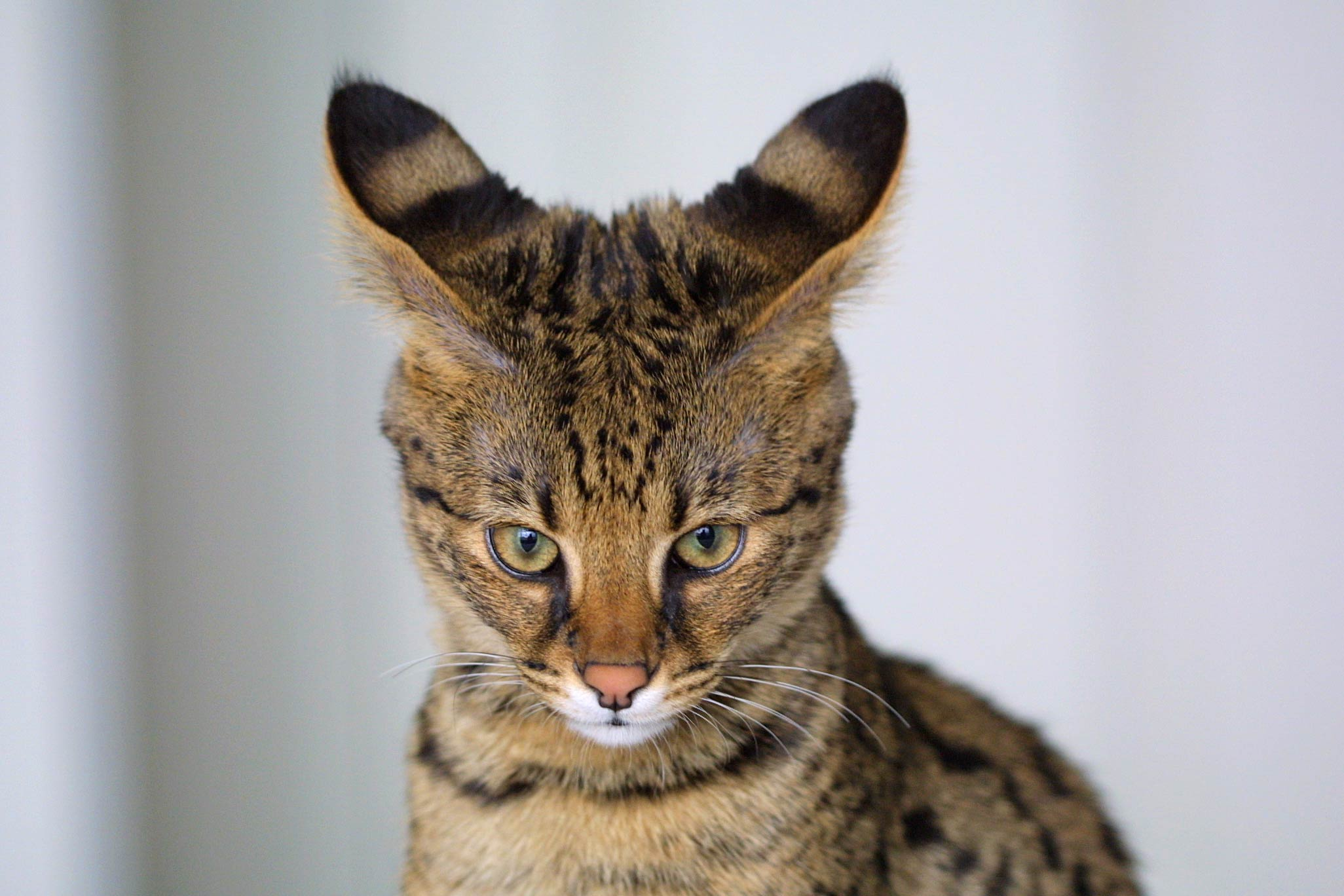

Breeds of each group are listed in Cephalic index.

== See also ==
- Artificial selection
- Brachycephalic airway obstructive syndrome
