= Canine epileptoid cramping syndrome =

Hereditary dog disease

Canine epileptoid cramping syndrome (CECS), previously known as Spike's disease, is a hereditary dog disease initially found in Border Terriers and has since been documented in many other dog breeds including Labrador Retrievers and Chihuahuas, with similarities to canine epilepsy. Its cause is unknown. In 2015, a study concluded: "Canine epileptoid cramping syndrome in Border Terriers is a gluten-sensitive movement disorder triggered and perpetuated by gluten and thus responsive to a gluten-free diet."

== Symptoms ==
CECS can first occur at any age between a few months and 7 years.

Symptoms include:

- cramping (often followed by exaggerated stretching)
- staggering
- trembling
- dizziness
- unusually slow or methodical walking
- borborygmus and/or intestinal cramping
- muscle contractions

Dogs typically remain alert and responsive during episodes that can last from a few seconds to several minutes. In some dogs, one or two episodes are seen followed by long-term or permanent remission. In others, episodes may be frequent or progressive in frequency and duration.

== Diagnosis ==
The neurological symptoms CECS are of a paroxysmal dyskinesia, which is a type of movement disorder. This type of movement disorder can be difficult to differentiate from epilepsy, with the main difference being that, unlike during an epileptic seizure, there is no impairment of the consciousness during an episode of CECS. Between episodes of CECS, the dog has normal movement.

== Treatment ==
Gluten free diet is an effective treatment for CECS. Other diets and some drugs might also help with some of the symptoms.

=== Drugs ===
Diazepam and clorazepate dipotassium have been used successfully to alleviate cramping in some cases, but have also failed to help in other cases. Scopolamine (Buscopan) rectal suppositories or injections and Gaviscon have been used to alleviate intestinal symptoms.

=== Diet ===
Some owners have had varying levels of success with dietary changes. In most cases, a gluten-free and/or raw diet is recommended, while some recommend avoiding grains, dairy, eggs, soy, beef, chicken, corn, rice, and artificial flavours and colours. Other owners report success with commercial hypoallergenic formula feeds.

== History ==
In 1994, Diana Plange, a German veterinarian and Border Terrier breeder (kennel Malepartus) received several phone calls from anxious Border Terrier owners whose dogs Ms. Plange had bred. They were observing epileptic-like problems in their dogs. However, many of the presentations did not fit the classic form of epilepsy. So after taking a further health survey, she decided to give up on her own breeding program and started working to find the cause of this condition, which was epileptoid in character. Ms. Plange arranged to have more than 100 Border Terriers examined thoroughly in her own surgery as well as in specialists' clinics. Many of the affected dogs showed abnormal liver function which resulted in much of the early focus implicating hepatic disorders as the cause of the newly discovered disease. However, after the number of symptomatic dogs with apparently normal livers increased, the concentration shifted to diet in early 1999, as through thorough investigation she found that the symptoms were responding to a nutritional change. It soon became clear that the condition must have a genetic (hereditary) background.

Ms. Plange wrote some articles discussing this disorder which were placed on her web site and published in different European dog magazines, as well as some veterinary magazines. As a result, there were more responses from Border Terrier owners and some veterinarians who felt their dogs were exhibiting these symptoms, not only from Germany and other parts of Europe, but from all over the world as well.

Samples of liver tissues, blood and urine were sent to several laboratories including the U.S. Thereupon, a worldwide cooperation among interested scientist started, and quite a number of people were involved. It was Erica Jabroer-ter Lüün from the Netherlands who stepped in at an early stage of Ms. Plange's investigations and in an enormous effort not only built up what can easily be recognized as the best Border Terrier database worldwide, but together with Ms. Plange, coordinated research at several European universities.

Ms. Plange came to the U.S. Border Terrier list in early 1999 inquiring about the BT's in America and asking if any dogs had unusual epileptic-like symptoms, because a number of suspected carriers were imported from GB to the USA. Ms. Kris Blake contacted Ms. Plange and found that the symptoms of her dog ‘Breaker’ were identical to those of the dogs in Germany and that his pedigree contained dogs who also suffered from the disorder. Then, with Kris Blake struggling with this unusual medical problem in her dog, the problem became recognized in the United States, too.

In 1996, Joke Miedema, a Dutch Border Terrier owner, acquired a puppy named Roughmoor Blue Spike (known as Spike). About a year later, the dog began exhibiting strange symptoms, starting with apparent absentness and occasional staggering. In 2000, Spike began exhibiting more severe symptoms including cramping and epileptic-like fits; tests performed at Utrecht University in 2002 were Prof Rothuizen already had examined Border Terriers from Germany, determined that the dog did not have epilepsy.

By the end of 2001, Spike was having 2–3 epileptoid episodes per week. Owners of cramping dogs began to connect via Internet groups, including a support group started by Miedema; the condition came to be known in NL as "Spike's Disease." In the spring of 2003, Diana Plange (as the person who first described the condition) gave the condition a descriptive name: Canine Epileptoid Cramping Syndrome.
