= Porcine adenovirus =

Scientific classification
- (unranked): Virus
- Realm: Varidnaviria
- Kingdom: Bamfordvirae
- Phylum: Preplasmiviricota
- Class: Pharingeaviricetes
- Order: Rowavirales
- Family: Adenoviridae
- Genus: Mastadenovirus

Groups included
- Porcine adenovirus 1; Porcine adenovirus 3; Porcine adenovirus 4; Porcine adenovirus 5

Cladistically included but traditionally excluded taxa
- All other mastadenoviruses

Species of virus

Porcine adenovirus is a virus in the family Adenoviridae. It causes mild gastrointestinal diseases in pigs and is thought to contribute to multifactorial porcine respiratory diseases complexes. Several strains of the virus can be found worldwide, and transmission occurs horizontally by the fecal-oral route.

== Clinical signs ==
Infection is often subclinical, and when clinical signs are seen they are mild and short-lived.

Gastrointestinal signs such as diarrhoea, anorexia and dehydration are most commonly seen in piglets. Reproductive signs such as abortion can be seen in adult sows.

Respiratory signs such as coughing can be seen if the infection is part of a multifactorial respiratory disease complex.

== Diagnosis and treatment ==
Histology, virus isolation, electron microscopy, immunoperoxidase and immunofluorescent staining, immunodiffusion, complement fixation, virus neutralisation and ELISA can all be used to confirm diagnosis.

Generally no treatment is required.

== See also ==
- Bovine adenovirus
- Porcine coronavirus (Coronavirus HKU15)
