= Bat adenovirus 3 =

Virus classification
- (unranked): Virus
- Realm: Varidnaviria
- Kingdom: Bamfordvirae
- Phylum: Preplasmiviricota
- Class: Pharingeaviricetes
- Order: Rowavirales
- Family: Adenoviridae
- Genus: Mastadenovirus
- Species: Mastadenovirus musauriti

Synonyms
- Bat adenovirus A; Bat adenovirus 3 (BtAdV-3); Bat adenovirus TJM

Species of virus

Bat adenovirus 3, also called Bat adenovirus TJM, is a virus in the genus Mastadenovirus of the family Adenoviridae. It is a double stranded DNA virus with no RNA sequence. The designation TJM refers to the strain as there are several species of Bat adenoviruses in three groups 1, 2, and 3.

== Virology ==
Bat adenovirus 3 is most closely related to Tree shrew adenovirus 1 and 'Canine adenovirus 1. Its genome consists of 30 putative genes exhibiting wide genetic diversity among bat species and within the same species harboring AdVs.

== Reservoir ==
Bat adenovirus 3 was first isolated from Myotis and Scotophilus kuhlii bats in Beijing, Hunan, Jiangxi, Yunnan, Guizhou and Hainan provinces in China in 2007 and 2008.

== Transmission ==
Transmission between same species is believed to be by droplet respiration and aerosolization of saliva, urine, and feces in closed environments such as caves and other bat roosts. Genomic analysis suggests canine adenoviruses may have originated from bites by vespertilionid bats.

== See also ==
- Adenovirus genome
