= Adenovirus serotype 14 =

Virus classification
- (unranked): Virus
- Realm: Varidnaviria
- Kingdom: Bamfordvirae
- Phylum: Preplasmiviricota
- Class: Pharingeaviricetes
- Order: Rowavirales
- Family: Adenoviridae
- Genus: Mastadenovirus
- Species: Human mastadenovirus B
- Virus: Adenovirus serotype 14

Virus serotype

Adenovirus serotype 14 (Ad14) is a serovar of adenovirus which, unlike other adenovirus serovars, is known to cause potentially fatal adenovirus infections. According to the United States Centers for Disease Control and Prevention (CDC), as of September 2007, outbreaks have been identified in four states in the U.S., with ten identified deaths since May 2006.

== Symptoms ==
The virus shows symptoms typical of adenoviral infections. Although these infections are common in humans, they are rarely fatal. Symptoms include:

1. Cold symptoms, such as coughing, sore throat, sneezing, and a runny nose
2. Pharyngitis
3. Bronchitis
4. Diarrhea
5. Pneumonia
6. Conjunctivitis
7. Fever
8. Cystitis (bladder inflammation)
9. Rash illness

The viral infection presents with symptoms similar to those of other common bacterial and viral infections, such as influenza.

== Genetics ==
Ad14 is a rare emerging virus that can cause severe respiratory infection, which can sometimes be fatal, even in healthy young adults. Ad14 isolates from all four states where outbreaks occurred were identical, based on DNA sequencing. However, the isolates were distinct from the 1955 Ad14 reference strain. This suggests that a new Ad14 variant is emerging and spreading in the United States.

== History ==
At least 150 illnesses have been caused by Ad14 in New York, Oregon, Washington, and Texas. Of these patients, 53 were hospitalized, 24 of whom were admitted to intensive-care units. In all reported cases, the isolated Ad14 strain was found to be genetically identical.

=== New York ===
The first death was that of a 12-day-old girl, born full-term and healthy, in New York in May 2006. Ad14 was isolated from postmortem swabs. No connection has been made between this case and cases in other states.

=== Texas ===
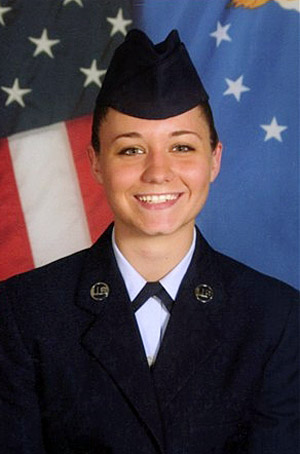
AB Villers died of Ad14 in 2007.

In February 2007, an outbreak of acute respiratory infections with fever was reported among trainees at Lackland Air Force Base (LAFB) in San Antonio. Of patients tested, 268 were positive for adenovirus. Of 118 serotyped patients, 106 (90%) were identified as Ad14. A total of 27 patients were hospitalized, one of whom, a nineteen-year-old Airman Basic, Paige Villers, died in the ICU. As of April 2009 another airman has died of this virus.

Steadily declining numbers of cases continued to be reported at LAFB through November 2007, with only 39 positive for Ad14 that month. Cases have also been reported from three other Texas military bases, but no positive connection has been made with the cases at LAFB.

=== Oregon ===
In early April 2007, 17 patients were reported to have been admitted at an Oregon hospital for severe pneumonia within the past month. Samples from 15 of these were positive for Ad14. The Oregon Public Health Division later identified samples from 31 patients from November 2006 to April 2007 as positive for Ad14. Oregon reported a total of seven Ad14 deaths.

=== Washington ===
In the Washington cases, four cases of Ad14 infection were reported. All the patients were smokers between the ages of 40 and 62. Three suffered from lung disease and the fourth had AIDS; the latter patient later died.
