= Titi monkey adenovirus =

Virus classification
- (unranked): Virus
- Realm: Varidnaviria
- Kingdom: Bamfordvirae
- Phylum: Preplasmiviricota
- Class: Pharingeaviricetes
- Order: Rowavirales
- Family: Adenoviridae
- Genus: Mastadenovirus
- Species: Mastadenovirus simuli

Species of virus

Titi monkey adenovirus (TMAdV), also called Titi monkey adenovirus 1, is an adenovirus first identified in a New World titi monkey of the genus Callicebus, and the virus also infected at least two humans. It is a large DNA-based virus which can cause death in monkeys, and respiratory illness has been recorded in humans. It was first discovered in Davis, California, at the California National Primate Research Center. The discovery of TMAdV was made by the laboratory of Charles Chiu and the UCSF-Abbott Viral Diagnostics and Discovery Center, using a DNA microarray test called the ViroChip that is able to detect all known as well as novel viruses. The virus is genetically different from any other adenovirus, and the origin or reservoir for TMAdV is still unknown. The significance of the discovery lies in the fact that adenovirus infections have always been thought to be species-specific, and the existence of adenoviruses that can infect both monkeys and humans raises the possibility of zoonotic transmission of adenoviruses.

== See also ==
- List of primate viruses
