= BAV =

BAV or Bav may refer to:

- Balloon aortic valvuloplasty, a medical procedure
- Bamboo Airways, a Vietnamese airline
- Banna virus, Reoviridae family
- Baotou Erliban Airport, China
- Battle Athletes Victory, a Japanese anime based on Battle Athletes
- Bavaria, a state of Germany
- Bicuspid aortic valve, a congenital condition of the aortic valve
- Bovine adenovirus, abbreviated BAdV
- Federal Office for Transport (Bundesanstalt für Verkehr, BAV), a government agency of Austria
- Federal Office for Transport (Switzerland) (Bundesanstalt für Verkehr, BAV), a government agency of Switzerland
- Vatican Library (Latin: Bibliotheca Apostolica Vaticana), the library of the Holy See, located in Vatican City
