= Nikhil Dhurandhar =

Indian physician

Nikhil V. Dhurandhar is a university professor who has published details about the proposed adipogenic effect of the human adenovirus AD-36 on laboratory animals and also its association with human obesity. He trained as a homeopath in India, studied Nutrition at North Dakota State University and has a PhD from Bombay. He has coined the term infectobesity.

In his research, Dhurandhar also found animals infected with Ad-36 experienced a decrease in cholesterol, triglycerides and blood sugar despite causing weight gain. His research includes isolating the protein in the virus that leads to lower metabolic numbers to create a treatment for diabetes.

Dhurandhar was the 2014-2015 president of the Obesity Society. He received the 2015 Osborne and Mendel Award, given by the American Society for Nutrition and recognizing recent outstanding basic research accomplishments in nutrition.

Dhurandhar is chair of the Department of Nutritional Sciences at Texas Tech University. Before coming to Texas Tech in 2014, he worked at the Pennington Biomedical Research Center.
