= Human adenovirus 41 =

Virus classification
- (unranked): Virus
- Realm: Varidnaviria
- Kingdom: Bamfordvirae
- Phylum: Preplasmiviricota
- Class: Pharingeaviricetes
- Order: Rowavirales
- Family: Adenoviridae
- Genus: Mastadenovirus
- Species: Mastadenovirus faecale
- Virus: Human adenovirus 41

Human adenovirus 41 (HAdV-F41), is an enteric adenovirus, a nonenveloped virus with an icosahedral nucleocapsid containing a double-stranded DNA genome.

It can particularly target the gastrointestinal tract to cause gastroenteritis, with symptoms similar to rotavirus gastroenteritis and norovirus. It may be present in the gut without causing symptoms and can be detected by using molecular based assays and enzyme immunoassay. As of August 2022, human adenovirus 41 has been identified in a majority of small children with hepatitis of unknown cause in 2 case series.

== Classification ==
Human adenovirus 41 belongs to the Adenoviridae family, and along with Human adenovirus 40, is a member of species Mastadenovirus faecale.

== Pathology ==
It can particularly target the gastrointestinal tract to cause gastroenteritis in very young children. Symptoms appear similar to rotavirus gastroenteritis and norovirus. It may be present in the gut without causing symptoms.

In an investigation of 5 children with an inflammation of the liver (hepatitis) of unknown cause at Birmingham, Alabama in October 2021, all turned out to have human adenovirus 41. In August 2022, 9 children in a U.S. case series of hepatitis of unknown cause and 27 of 30 children in a U.K. case series with hepatitis of unknown cause who underwent molecular testing tested positive for human adenovirus type 41 in a sample. It was unclear whether human adenovirus 41 was the cause, however.

== Diagnosis ==
It cannot be detected using traditional cell culture isolation, but can be detected by using molecular based assays and enzyme immunoassay.

== Epidemiology ==
Globally it is a significant cause of gastroenteritis, particularly in low and middle income countries, but less common than rotavirus and norovirus. How frequently it occurs in sewage and drinking water is not known. Type 40 is less common.

== History ==
It was first identified in 1983.
