= VA RNA =

Non-coding RNA found in adenovirus

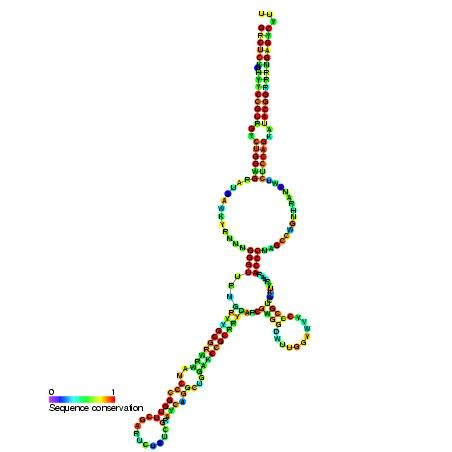
- Predicted secondary structure and sequence conservation of VA

Identifiers
- Symbol: VA
- Rfam: RF00102

Other data
- RNA type: Gene
- Domain(s): Eukaryota; Viruses
- SO: SO:0005836
- PDB structures: PDBe

The VA (viral associated) RNA is a type of non-coding RNA found in adenovirus. It plays a role in regulating translation. There are two copies of this RNA called VAI or VA RNAI and VAII or VA RNAII. These two VA RNA genes are distinct genes in the adenovirus genome. VA RNAI is the major species with VA RNAII expressed at a lower level. Neither transcript is polyadenylated and both are transcribed by PolIII.

== Function ==
VAI stimulates the translation of both early and late viral genes including E3 and hexon. VAII does not stimulate translation. Transient transfection assays have shown that VAI-RNA increases the stability of ribosome-bound transcripts.

VAI RNA is processed in the cell to create 22 nucleotide long RNAs that can act as siRNA or miRNA. VAI RNA functions as a decoy RNA for the double stranded RNA activated protein kinase R which would otherwise phosphorylate eukaryotic initiation factor 2.

== Structure ==
VA RNA is composed of two stem-loops separated by a central region essential for function.
