= Adenovirus serotype 36 =

Human adenovirus 36

Virus classification
- (unranked): Virus
- Realm: Varidnaviria
- Kingdom: Bamfordvirae
- Phylum: Preplasmiviricota
- Class: Pharingeaviricetes
- Order: Rowavirales
- Family: Adenoviridae
- Genus: Mastadenovirus
- Species: Mastadenovirus dominans
- Serotype: Human adenovirus 36

Virus serotype

Human adenovirus 36 (HAdV-36) or Ad-36 or Adv36 is one of 52 types of adenoviruses. It causes respiratory and eye infections in humans.

== Role in obesity ==
There is a possible positive correlation between body fat and the presence of AD-36 antibodies in the blood.

As of 2007, AD-36 is the only human adenovirus that has been linked with human obesity.

== See also ==
- Infectobesity
