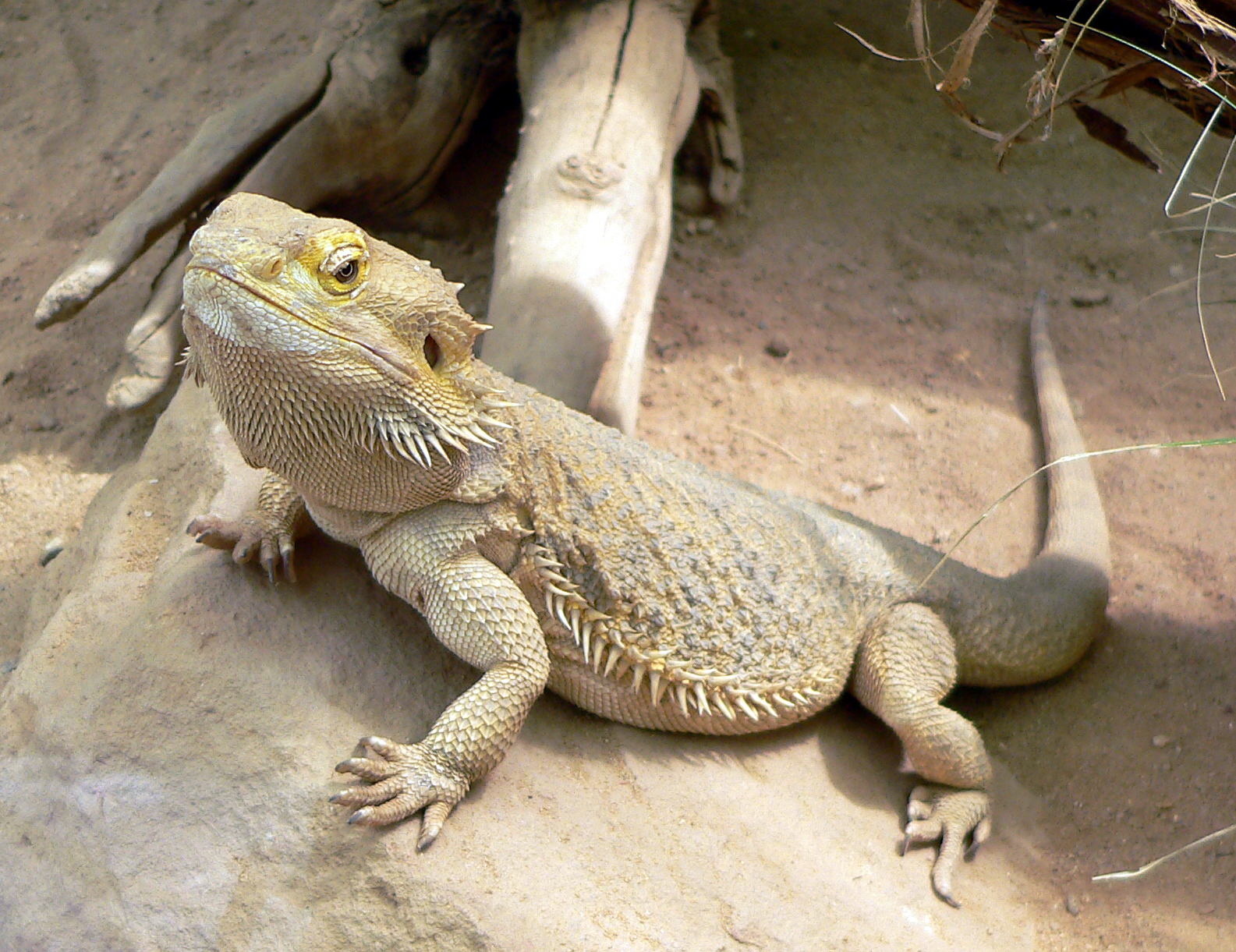
- At Frankfurt Zoological Garden

Conservation status
- Least Concern (IUCN 3.1)

Scientific classification
- Kingdom: Animalia
- Phylum: Chordata
- Class: Reptilia
- Order: Squamata
- Suborder: Iguania
- Family: Agamidae
- Subfamily: Amphibolurinae
- Genus: Pogona
- Species: P. vitticeps

Binomial name
- Pogona vitticeps Ahl, 1926
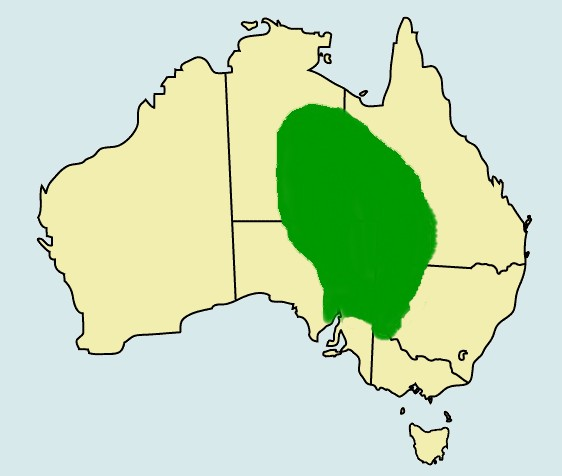
- Native distribution

= Central bearded dragon =

Species of lizard

The central bearded dragon (Pogona vitticeps), also known commonly as the inland bearded dragon, is a species of lizard in the family Agamidae. The species is native to eastern and central Australia. Its common name refers to the pouch under their chin that they can inflate and darken in coloration, similar to the frilled lizard. The bearded dragon grows to around up to 60 cm (24 in) from head to tail tip and can weigh 550 g (1.2 lb). Males are generally larger than females. The lizard's body is generally brown, tan, yellow, and red.

== Taxonomy ==
Pogona vitticeps was first described by German zoologist Ernst Ahl in 1926, who placed it in the genus Amphibolurus.

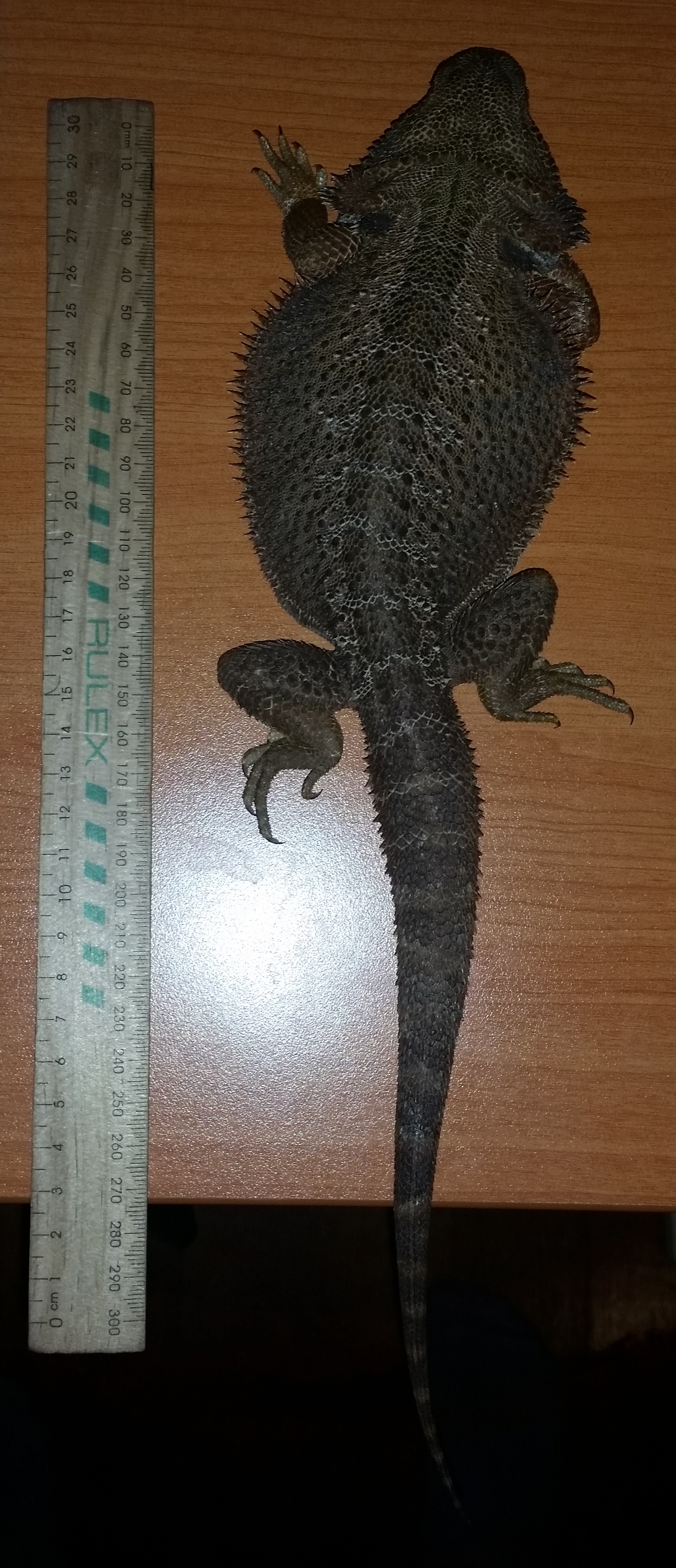
In captivity, showing size.

Central bearded dragon

== Description ==
Mature bearded dragons can reach a total length of around 60 cm (24 in), or two feet, with the tail accounting for more than half of that. Some sexual dimorphism is present, as males can be distinguished from females by a wider cloacal opening, a wider tail-base, a larger and more angular head, a more developed beard (guttural throat-pouch), and the obvious possession of hemipenes. Males also have more pronounced femoral pores than females (these can be seen as waxy bumps on the underside of the back legs). Bearded dragons can vary widely in scale colouration, ranging from a blend of light brown, reddish-brown, red, yellow, white and orange; additionally, numerous colour "morphs" exist today, due to selective breeding by hobbyists and professionals.

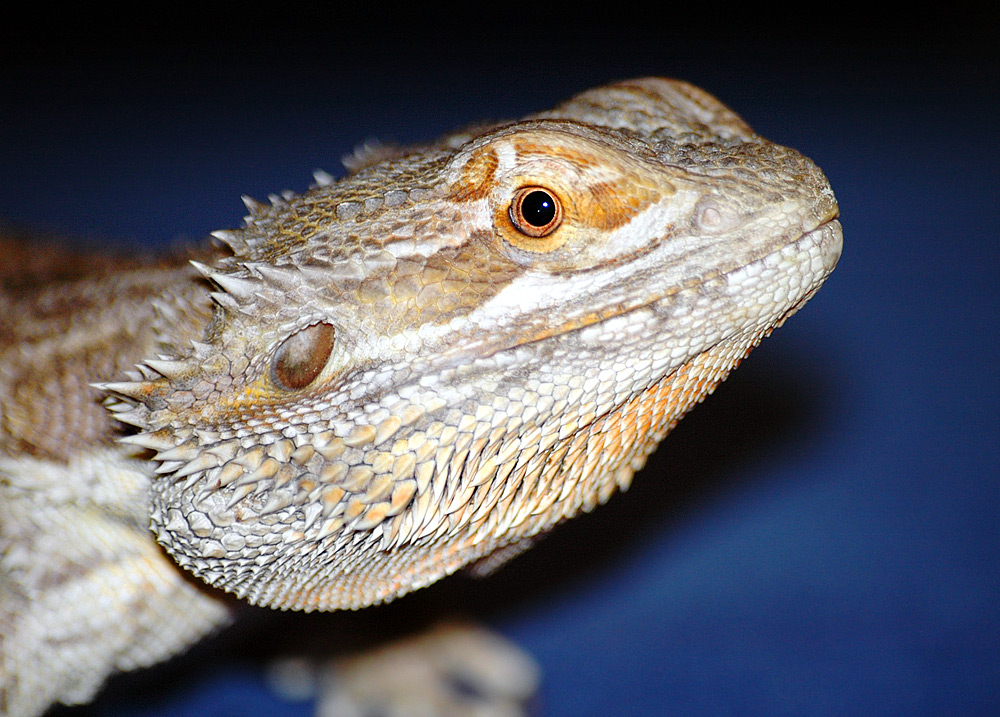
Head side view

Somewhat like chameleons, bearded dragons are capable of inducing moderate changes in coloration based on mood. Additionally, they can slightly raise the pointed scales that run along either side of their throat, neck, head and torso by inhaling air into their lungs to maximum capacity, thus appearing larger to predators. The sharp-looking growths and protrusions are, in actuality, quite soft and delicate to the touch, but may be off-putting to predators such as birds of prey, foxes, feral dogs or dingos. When cornered or threatened, a bearded dragon will flatten its body against the ground, expand its rib cage outwards, open its mouth and expand its "beard" (guttural pouch; similar to a frilled lizard's defense tactics, albeit on a smaller scale). The guttural pouch is what essentially earns the species its nickname of "beardie", and can darken in color when threatened or during courtship or territorial displays. Both of these characteristics appear similar to a human's beard. Males typically have a darker "beard" than females, and during mating season and courtship it will typically darken to near-black. The bearded dragon, like most agamid lizards, has strong legs which enable it to lift its body completely off the ground while it moves. This is done to reduce heat absorption from the hot ground, and facilitates airflow under the body.

A study conducted in 2014 established the existence of endogenous circadian rhythm in pigmentation changes in P. vitticeps; if exposed to sun, the dorsal skin of the lizard becomes darker, and if exposed to darkness, it becomes lighter. Under constant darkness (i.e. in the subjective night), the lizard's dorsal skin becomes the lightest.

Many species of Pogona have a parietal eye (or "third eye"), a photoreceptor found on the center of the forehead. This unique feature is responsible for thermoregulation and hormone regulation, and possibly helps the lizards make decisions based on the seasons, weather, etc. A March 2020 study of the central bearded dragon found that light-dependent magnetoreception occurs when light with a wavelength under 580 nanometers enters the parietal eye.

== Ecology and behaviour ==
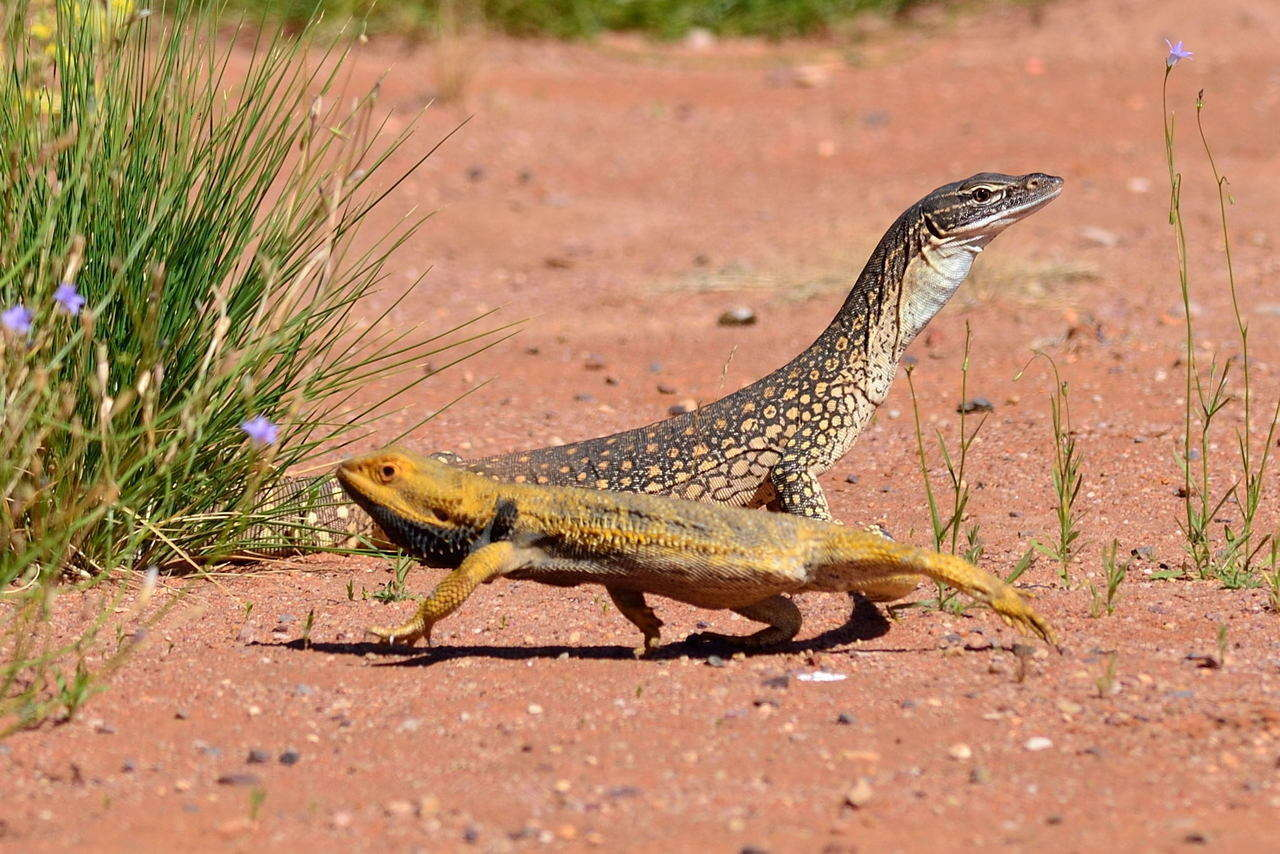
In South Australia, with a sand goanna in the background

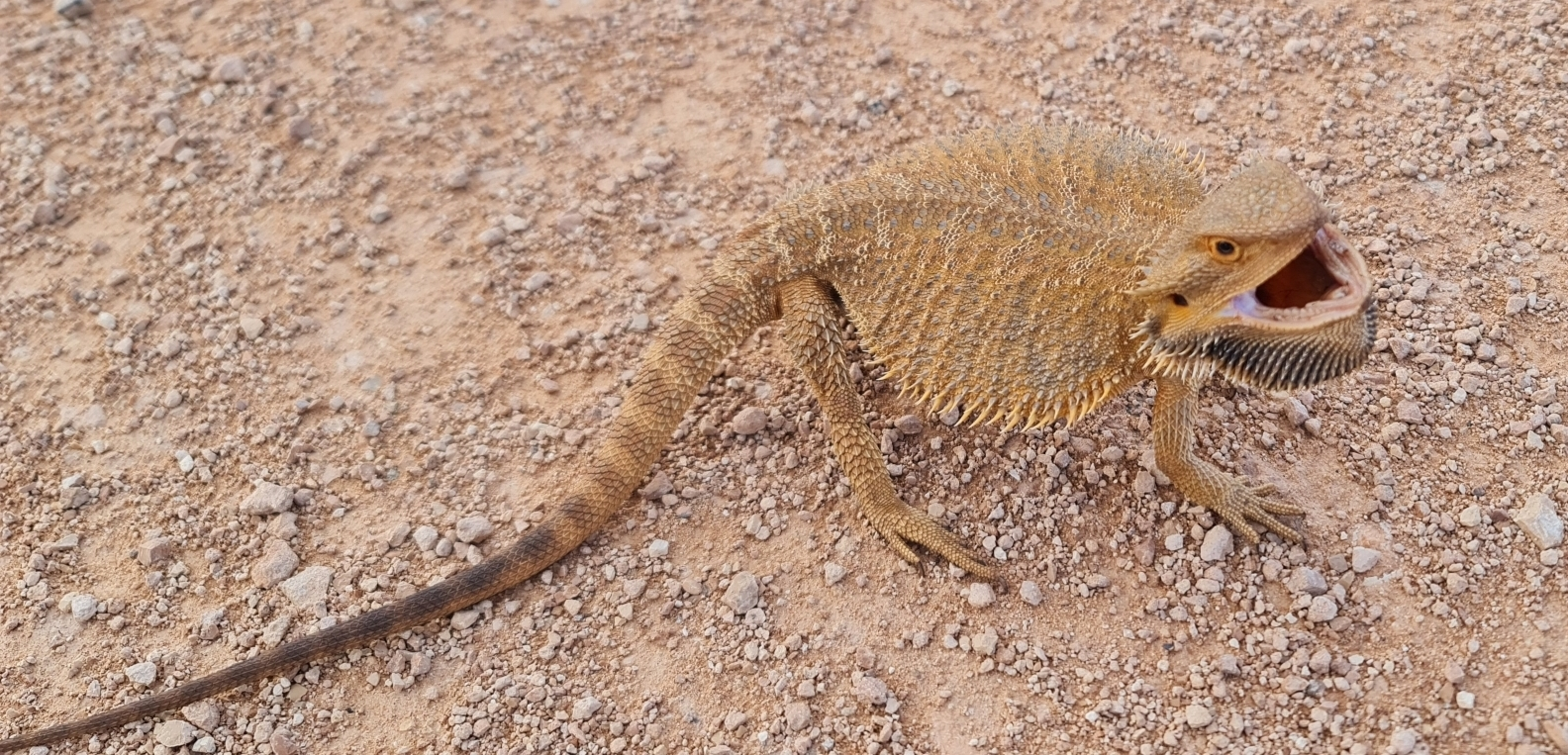
Defensive posture, in South Australia

P. vitticeps is native to semiarid woodland, arid woodland, and rocky desert areas of Central Australia, primarily the inland regions of New South Wales, Northern Territory, Queensland and South Australia. They are skilled climbers and often spend just as much time perching and basking on tree limbs, fence posts, and within bushes as they do on the ground. They often spend the mornings and early evenings sunning themselves on exposed branches or rocks, and retreat to shady areas or burrows during the hottest parts of the afternoon.

P. vitticeps are opportunistic omnivores. They live in areas where food may be hard to find, thus they are not particularly finicky eaters. Their stomachs are large enough to accommodate significant quantities of vegetation, fruits, insects, worms, and the occasional small rodent or lizard. Favored insect prey includes crickets, grasshoppers, beetles, caterpillars, moths, butterflies, or any insect that can comfortably be swallowed. They will also eat mealworms, kingworms, parsley and kale and vegetables like pepper and sweet potato. An analysis of their summer diet as wild adults revealed that 26% of the food ingested (by volume) was Drepanotermes termite alates, which are only seasonally available. Plant matter made up 54% of the diet by volume.

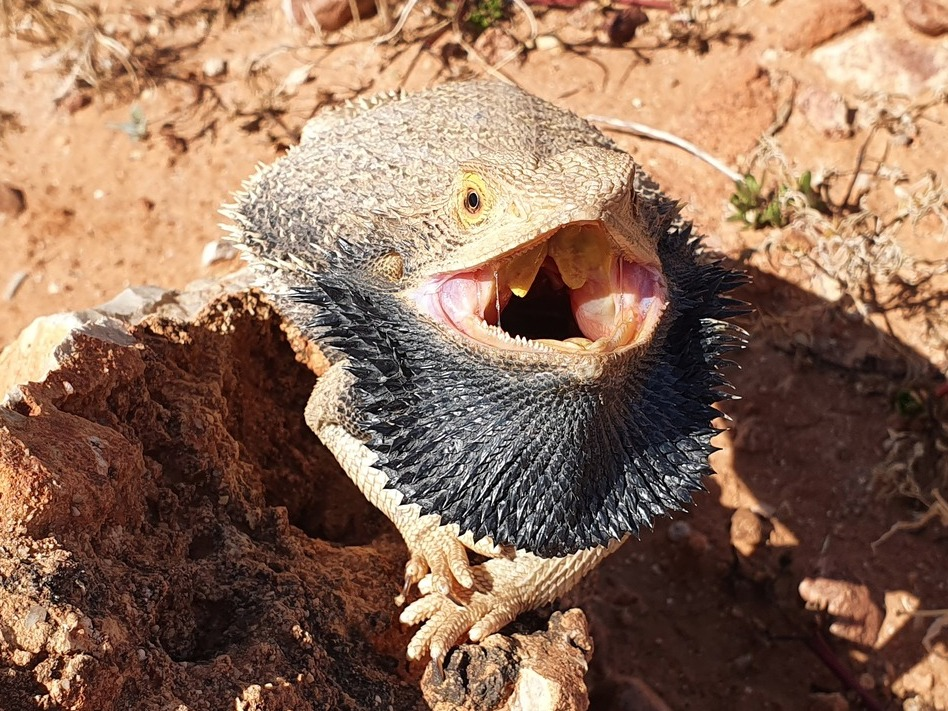
Displaying the "beard" in defence, in Queensland

Bearded dragons do not vocalize, except to hiss softly when threatened. Instead, they communicate through colour displays, posture, and physical gestures, such as arm waving and head bobbing. Bearded dragons are not social animals, but will sometimes gather in groups, especially in popular feeding or basking areas. At these times, a distinct hierarchy will emerge: the highest-ranking animals will take the best – usually the highest or sunniest – basking spots, and all other individuals arrange themselves lower down. If a low-ranking animal tries to challenge one of the dominant dragons, the dominant animal will demonstrate its superiority by bobbing its head and inflating its beard, at which point the challenger may signal submission by waving one of its arms in a slow or fast circle. If the low-ranking dragon does not submit, it will return the head bob, and a standoff or fight may ensue.

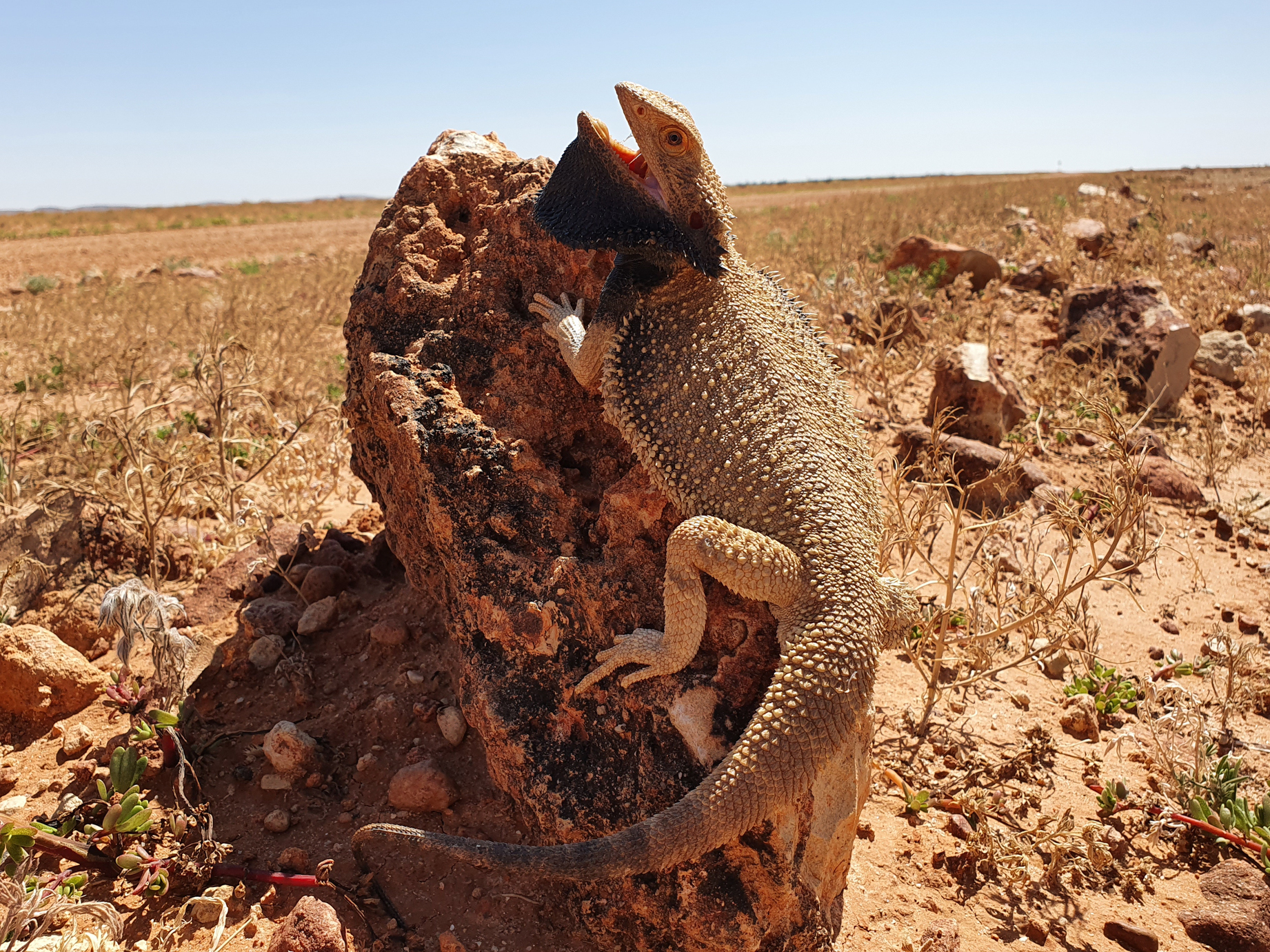
In Queensland

The head bob gestures are:

- Slow bowing motion – often used by adult females to signal submission to a male
- Fast bob – used by males to signal dominance (often accompanied by an inflated and/or blackened beard)
- Violent bob – used by males just before mating; much more vigorous, and usually sets the animal's whole body in motion
- Both males and females will occasionally do fast and violent head bobs, which shows they are stressed out and need to be isolated.

The male will wave only to show submission to a dominant male, whereas the female will wave, followed by a slow head bob, to show she is ready to mate. Gravid females will often refuse the advances of a male by chasing him and lying on his back.

When under direct attack, the central bearded dragon opens its mouth to display its yellow membranes and extend its beard. It darkens the colour of its skin and flattens its body, and will hiss and make small jumps towards the attacker. Bearded dragons are not known to attack humans.

Adult male bearded dragons can bite more forcefully than adult females and this difference is associated with greater head dimensions.

Bearded dragons have been shown to be able to learn from watching the behaviour of conspecifics. An experiment demonstrated that after one individual was trained to open a door to reach a food item, most other bearded dragons watching this action were able to perform it as well.

== Reproduction ==
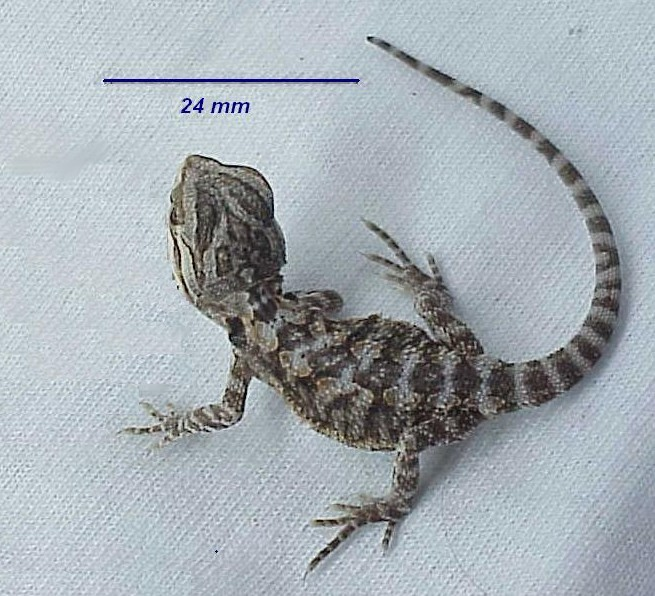
Baby bearded dragon

The age of sexual maturity has not been measured, although it is estimated to be about one or two years. Body size and growth rates are more important than age when determining sexual maturity in bearded dragons. Males will become very aggressive towards each other and will assert their dominance by inflating their beards and through fast head bobbing. Breeding typically occurs in the early spring. Females will lay a clutch of 11–30 oblong-shaped eggs in a shallow nest dug in the sand. After being laid, the eggs are buried and are left unattended. The eggs will hatch approximately 60 to 80 days later, depending on the incubation temperature. In captivity, they can be incubated in a styrofoam fish box, but without a male lizard, the female's eggs will not be fertile. However, a female bearded dragon can retain sperm, and thus produce fertile eggs even after being separated from a male.

Courtship involves the male "head bobbing" to display dominance. If the female displays submissive behaviour, the male will use his mouth to grab the back of the female's head and the male will also wrap his front legs around the female's upper torso to keep her from moving. Copulation and insemination are quick. The gestation period averages about a month and a half.

=== Thermally-induced sex reversal ===
The sex of bearded dragons is typically determined genetically via a ZW sex-determination system. Unlike the XY system in mammals (where males are XY and females XX), bearded dragon males possess two of the same chromosomes (ZZ) while females carry the distinct pair (ZW).

A 2015 study demonstrated that when bearded dragon eggs are incubated at high temperatures (typically above 32 °C / 90 °F), genetic males (ZZ) undergo sex reversal and develop as functional females. These sex-reversed ZZ females are fertile and have been observed to produce nearly twice as many eggs as standard ZW females. Because these sex-reversed females lack the W chromosome entirely, mating them with normal ZZ males produces offspring that are exclusively ZZ.

It has been shown that while genetic (ZW) females follow a standard set of instructions directed by the sex chromosomes, sex-reversed (ZZ) females are feminized through cellular stress pathways triggered by the heat. Despite these completely different developmental beginnings, the two pathways eventually converge to produce indistinguishable functional ovaries.

Juvenile sex-reversed females exhibit male-like behaviors, being bolder, more active, and preferring higher body temperatures than ZW females. However, the difference in physical traits does not persist as they age. Adult sex-reversed dragons lack the larger heads and bite force of males, indistinguishably resembling ZW females.

== In captivity ==
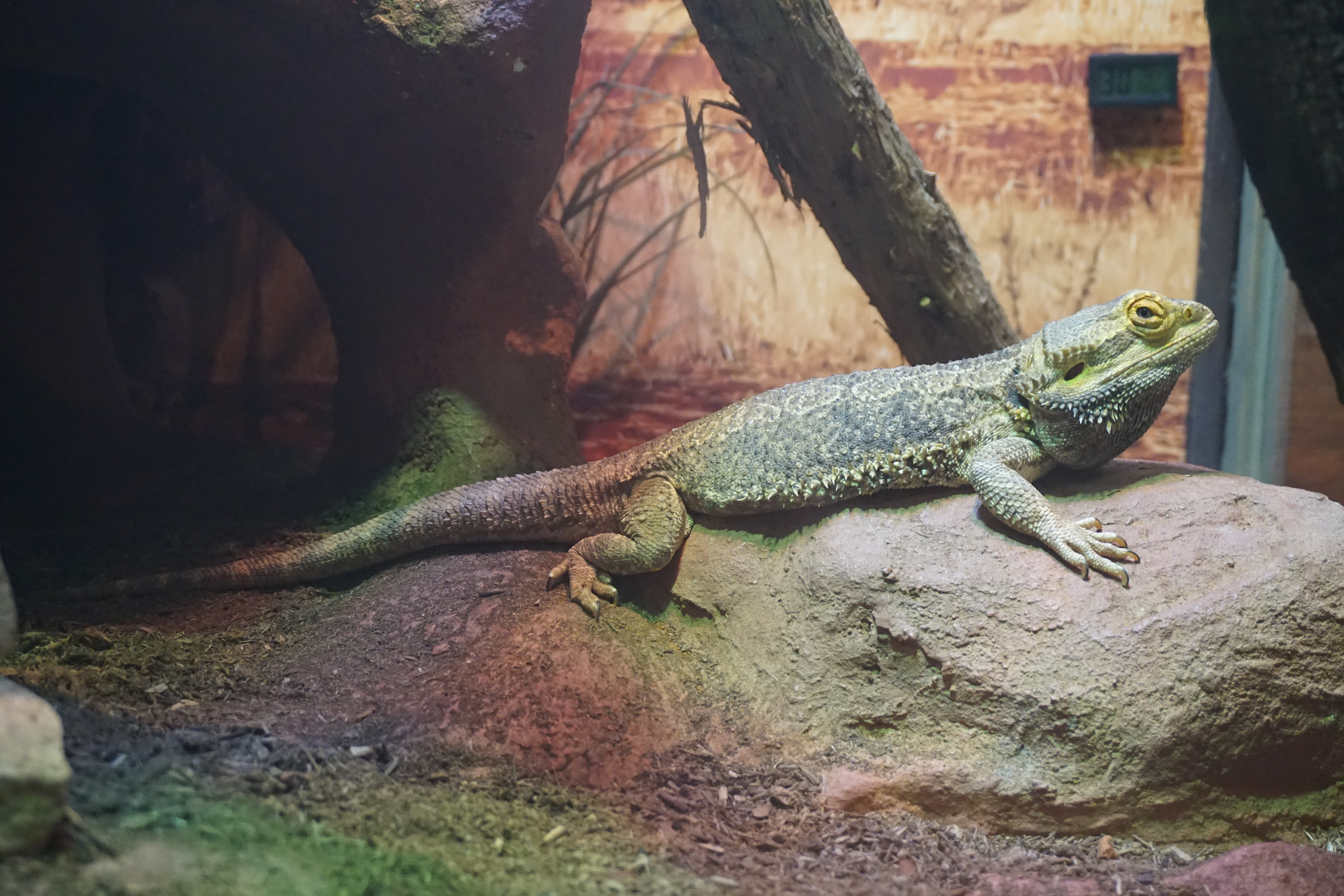
A central bearded dragon at the Milwaukee Public Museum

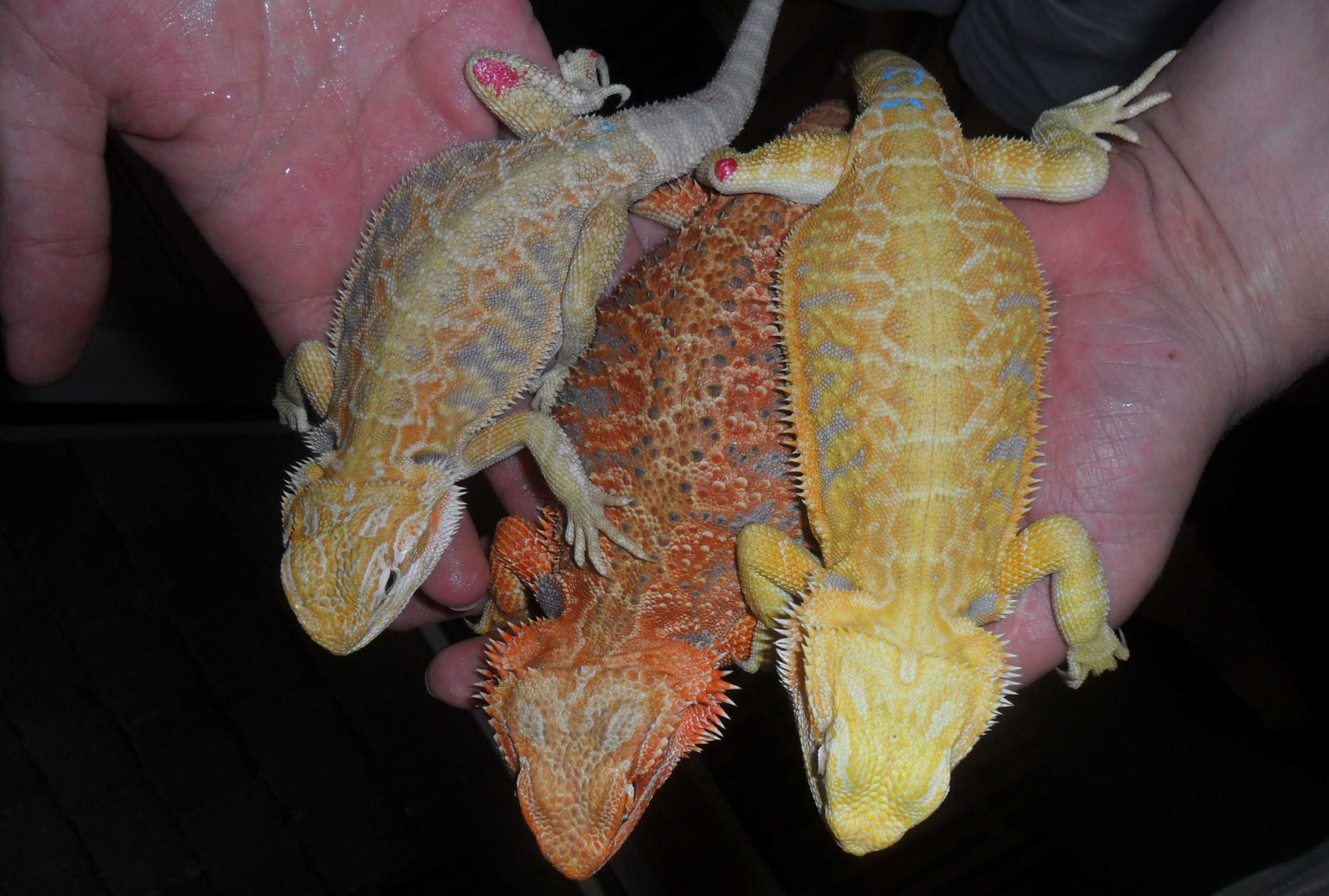
Selective breeding of bearded dragons has produced numerous colour morphs

=== History ===
Most captive central bearded dragons originate from stock illegally exported from Australia between 1974 and 1990, following the Australian government's ban on the export of native wildlife in the 1960s. By the early 1990s, a captive-bred population was established in the global pet trade. Today, bearded dragons are one of the most popular reptile pets globally, with a 2021 study identifying it as the most kept reptile species in the United States and Western Europe.

=== Artificial selection ===
Selective breeding in captivity has produced distinct phenotypes, or "morphs," with colors and patterns rare in nature. Breeders have isolated lines with high concentrations of red, orange, and white (hypomelanistic) pigmentation, as well as patternless varieties.

Breeders also select for structural mutations affecting scalation. The "Leatherback" trait results in reduced spines and smoother skin. Breeding two Leatherback dragons produces "Silkback" offspring, which lack scales entirely. A 2021 study found that these scale-less dragons lose water through evaporation at twice the rate of wild-type individuals, making them highly susceptible to dehydration.

=== Health ===
Captive populations of bearded dragons are susceptible to Agamid adenovirus 1, a viral pathogen that can cause liver disease, enteritis, and failure to thrive. While many adult dragons are asymptomatic carriers, the virus can be fatal in juvenile or stressed animals.

Bearded dragons are also prone to Metabolic Bone Disease (MBD) if denied adequate ultraviolet (UVB) lighting and dietary calcium. Without UVB radiation, the lizards cannot synthesize vitamin D3, preventing dietary calcium absorption. This deficiency causes calcium leaching from the skeleton, resulting in fractures, tremors, and deformities.
