= Hapag-Lloyd Flight 3378 =

2000 aviation accident in Austria

- The aircraft after crash landing

Accident
- Date: 12 July 2000
- Summary: Fuel exhaustion due to maintenance error and pilot error
- Site: Vienna-Schwechat Airport, Vienna, Austria; 48°05′00″N 16°35′40″E

Aircraft
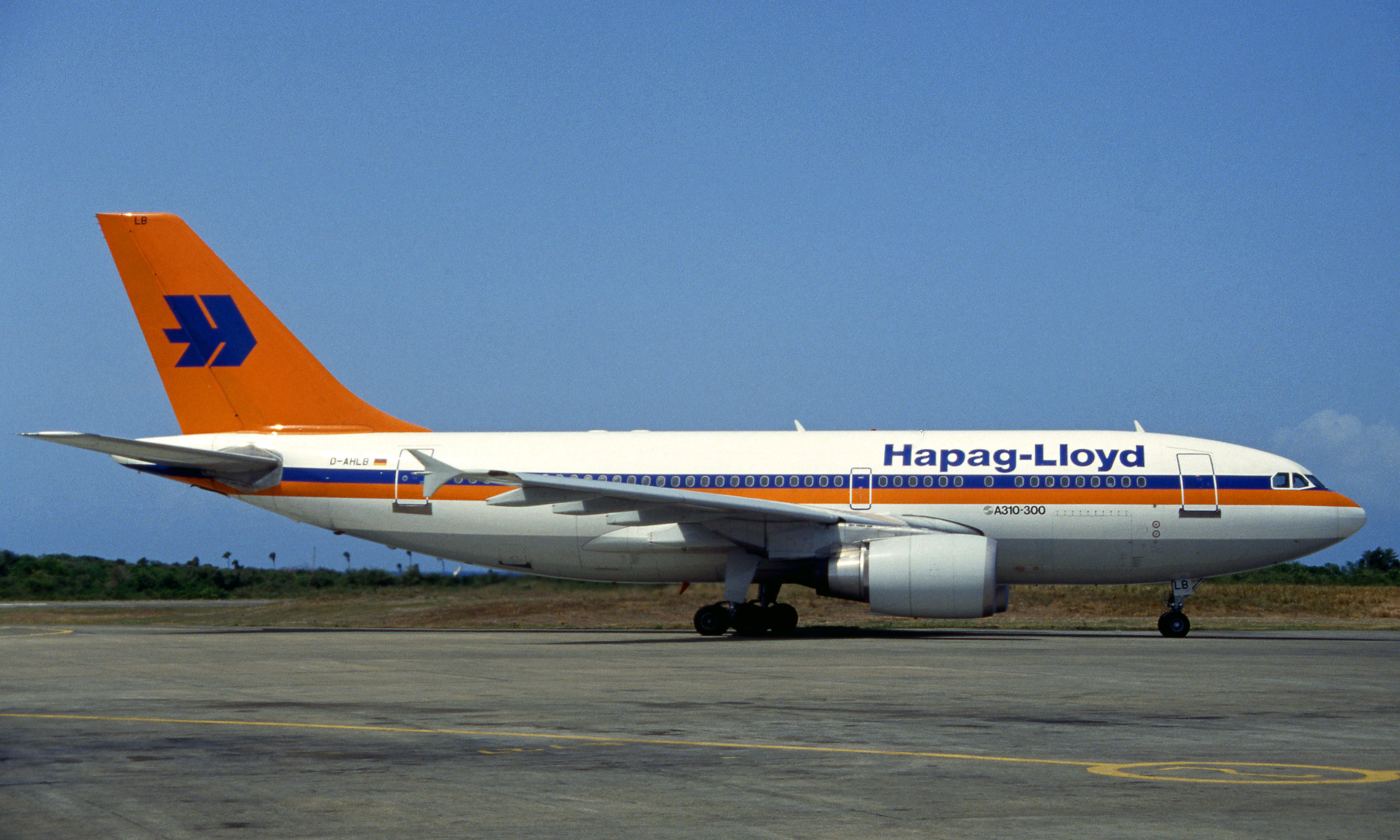
- D-AHLB, the aircraft involved in the accident, seen in 1991
- Aircraft type: Airbus A310-304
- Operator: Hapag-Lloyd Flug
- IATA flight No.: HF3378
- ICAO flight No.: HLF3378
- Call sign: HAPAG LLOYD 3378
- Registration: D-AHLB
- Flight origin: Chania International Airport, Chania, Greece
- Destination: Hannover Airport, Hannover, Germany
- Occupants: 151
- Passengers: 143
- Crew: 8
- Fatalities: 0
- Injuries: 26
- Survivors: 151

Hapag-Lloyd Flight 3378 (HF-3378) was a passenger service operated by Hapag-Lloyd Flug from Chania, on the island of Crete, Greece, to Hannover, Germany. On 12 July 2000, the aircraft flying the route, an Airbus A310, had 143 passengers and 8 crew on board, set off for Hannover leaving the landing gear fully extended, as a precaution, since a malfunction had prevented its proper retraction after take-off. The plane eventually ran out of fuel while attempting a diversion to Vienna, crash-landing just short of runway 34. No fatalities resulted, although the aircraft was written off.

== Aircraft ==
The aircraft involved was an Airbus A310-304 with the registration D-AHLB. It was equipped with two General Electric CF6-80C2A2 engines and was 10 years old, having its maiden flight on 25 October 1989. It was delivered new to Hapag-Lloyd Flug on 10 January 1990, and had logged 41307 flight hours and 13789 cycles before the accident.

== Accident ==
Captain Wolfgang Arminger (56) was the pilot in command; and First Officer Thorsten Rökrath (25) was the pilot monitoring. The flight departed at 11:59 local time (Eastern European Summer Time, EEST), 8:59 UTC, shortly after which it was found to be impossible to fully retract the landing gear, as indicated by both the red "gear unsafe" lamp and the yellow "gear door open" lamp. After a total of four retraction attempts, the gear was left in the fully extended condition where all lights indicated a valid condition with the doors trimmed for cruise airspeed. The flight continued towards Germany, as fuel would anyway need to be burned (or dumped) before landing because of the maximum landing-weight limit. The crew had to cope with a heavier cockpit workload that was aggravated by the unavailability of the airline HF radio station for technical consultation, forcing the first officer to spend almost an hour establishing alternative communications with the airline through ACARS and Stockholm Radio. Using the Flight Management System (FMS), the crew estimated the aircraft's fuel consumption, and the captain in consultation with dispatch decided to shorten the flight and divert to Munich Airport, where another A310 would be ready to take the passengers to their final destination. However, the captain ignored the fact that the FMS was not designed to take into account the extra drag produced by the extended landing gear. In fact, Munich was not within range, as eventually became clear from the unexpectedly rapid fall in fuel reserves. At about 12:00 Central European Summer Time (CEST), 10:00 UTC, this led the captain to decide to divert to Vienna-Schwechat Airport.

At 11:57 CEST, the first officer noted and reported to the captain that they had already consumed half of their initial fuel load, although they had progressed to only their last waypoint still inside Greece, YNN, about a third of the total distance to Vienna. At 12:34 CEST, the FMS prediction for fuel remaining upon arrival at Vienna fell to 1.9 tonnes (4,200 lb). Under such conditions, the airline rules require immediate diversion to the nearest suitable airport, which would have been Zagreb, ten minutes away. The investigation report states "there was no evidence of immediate crew response to this situation." While contact with Zagreb ATC was made nine minutes later, the crew pressed on towards Vienna, requesting the most direct access to a runway. At 12:53, the crew notified Vienna ATC that if direct runway access were not available, they would prefer to divert to closer Graz. This prompted Vienna ATC to inquire and finally learn that the flight was short of fuel, but the pilots declared no emergency, still anticipating a normal landing. When the fuel gauges fell through 1.9 t remaining, the first officer twice urged the captain to declare an emergency, but the captain postponed such action. At 13:01, the "LT-Fuel low level" warning indicated remaining fuel of 1340 kg, which automatically generates an ACARS message. At this time, the aircraft was 42 nautical miles (78 km) northeast of Zagreb, 85 nautical miles (157 km) south-east from Graz, and 131 nautical miles (243 km) from the destination Vienna. At 13:07, the crew finally declared an emergency due to lack of fuel, while still stating that they expected to reach Vienna.

At this point, the crew was still debating a possible diversion to Graz, but discovered that the approach chart for that airport was missing from the aircraft map collection. At 13:12, the crew still debated the contribution of the FMS to their flight; the first officer (correctly) distrusted its performance with gear down, while the captain still defended it. The captain instructed the first officer to request no emergency services for post-landing, and to defer deployment of the flaps, especially if the engines flamed out. At 13:26, the pressure dropped at the inlet of the right external fuel pump, but the pump was left running. Both engines flamed out 12 nautical miles (22 km) from the runway, although the first officer was able to restart them for a few more minutes of thrust. As there was no time for the final checklist, the "Land Recovery" switch was neglected, resulting in limited operation of inboard ailerons needed for stability control at low speeds. The left wing tip hit the grassy surface about 660 m short of the runway, followed by the left landing gear, which collapsed after 22 m. The aircraft skidded on the left engine and the right main landing gear, over arrays of approach lights and antennas, turning left 90°, and coming to rest off the runway near the end taxiway. About 26 passengers received minor injuries while using the escape slides. Although the photographs suggest that the aircraft remained structurally intact, it was written off due to the severe damage to the underside of the fuselage. This was the sixth hull-loss of an Airbus A310.

== Investigation ==
The final report on the investigation of the accident was published (only in German) on 21 March 2006 by the Air Accident Investigation Board (Flugunfalluntersuchungsstelle) of the Austrian Federal Office for Transport (Bundesanstalt für Verkehr, BAV). The report identified the cause of the failure of landing gear retraction as a minor oversight during maintenance; an inadequately secured lock nut allowed a screw to gradually turn, eventually leading to a 10 mm adjustment error that prevented complete retraction.

The report identified several key reasons why the cockpit crew failed to adequately cope with this relatively minor technical malfunction of the landing gear, continuing the flight to engine failure due to fuel exhaustion.

- The crew failed to comply with company regulations regarding fuel reserves, caused by several human factors, most importantly extreme work load and stress, leading to loss of situational awareness.
  - Fuel reserves were determined exclusively using the FMS, due to lack of awareness of its inapplicability with gear down.
  - The captain failed to divert to nearby Zagreb airport upon receiving the low-fuel level warning, apparently becoming excessively single-goal oriented.
- Airbus documentation failed to adequately and clearly inform flight crew of the limitations that apply to fuel management using the FMS.
- The airline provided insufficient documentation in the checklist for "abnormal landing gear up indication," and Operations Division provided inadequate review of fuel requirements.

The report makes 14 recommendations for improvements in systems, documents and procedures to avoid such problems in future.

== Criminal prosecution ==
Hapag-Lloyd reported that the Captain Wolfgang Arminger voluntarily left the airline six months after the accident. In 2004, a Hannover district court convicted Captain Arminger of "dangerous interference in the air traffic", saying he was "endangering others' lives" mainly by failing to divert to Zagreb, and gave him a six-month suspended prison sentence. The conviction was criticized by German court reporter Gisela Friedrichsen who thought the two court sessions of the main trial were not enough to present and evaluate all evidence.

A report published in 2012 by the American Bar Association argues that airline safety is undermined by such prosecutions because its threat would impede the investigative processes.

== See also ==
- List of airline flights that required gliding
