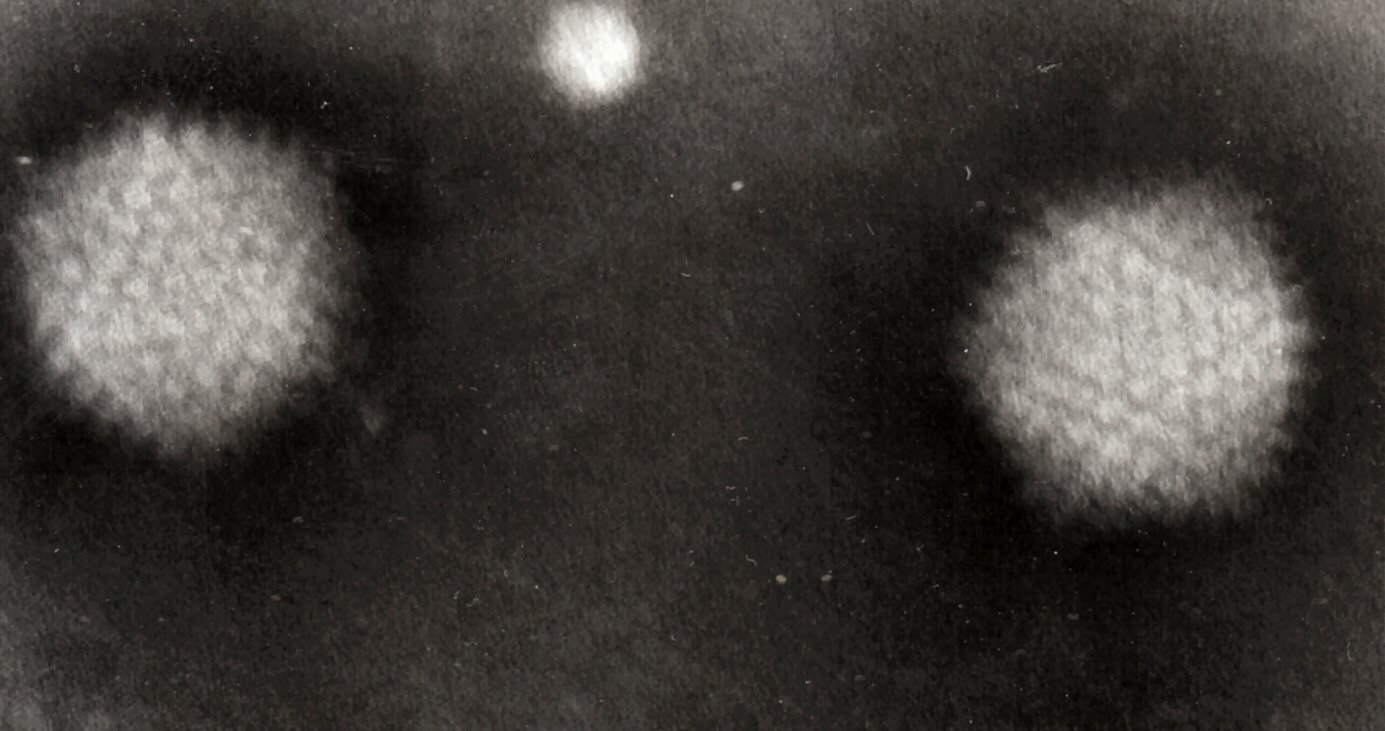
- Transmission electron micrograph of two adenovirus particles

Virus classification
- (unranked): Virus
- Realm: Varidnaviria
- Kingdom: Bamfordvirae
- Phylum: Preplasmiviricota
- Class: Pharingeaviricetes
- Order: Rowavirales
- Family: Adenoviridae
- Genus: Barthadenovirus
- Species: Lizard atadenovirus B

= Agamid adenovirus =

Lizard atadenovirus B

Species of virus

Agamid adenovirus (Agamid AdV1), also called Bearded dragon adenovirus 1, is a type of virus in the Adenoviridae family. The virus is widespread in captive populations of Pogona vitticeps, known commonly as the central bearded dragon, in the United States. Other countries with confirmed cases are Australia, Japan, Germany, The Netherlands, Belgium, the UK, and El Salvador. It is often discovered in association with other infections, and causes increased juvenile mortality and adult deaths.

== History ==
The first detection of adenovirus-like particles in Bearded Dragons was reported from New Zealand in 1982 (Julian and Durham, 1985).

== Infection and consequences ==
In a study published by the Journal of Virology, intranuclear inclusions, or infected cells, were found in the intestinal mucosa, hepatocytes, and bile ducts. Even where an Agamid shows no signs of infection, many are believed to be sub-clinically infected, or carriers of the virus. Although they show no signs they can infect others. It is known that the virus is transferable through fecal-oral contact, however it is speculated that it can be passed in ways as of current research are unknown. Agamid Adenovirus is becoming widespread in the United States, with several breeders admitting infection and shutting down their current projects. However some breeders are still not convinced of the dangers of Agamid Adenovirus, thus they do not test, they could be selling Adenovirus positive offspring. A report from Louisiana State University found that baby and juvenile Bearded Dragons have a high mortality rate associated with this virus.

The following is quoted from Cheri Smith's compilation of Adenovirus symptoms: "Any animal that is suspected of having this virus should be isolated, never breed and great care taken when handling between animals. All animals in contact with another that is suspected of having it or confirmed should be isolated from each other, never bred, certainly never sold to others that may unknowingly start the cycle again with other animals. One confirmed case had a couple with an ill animal that brought it to a breeder to look at and he followed all safety precautions, only to find the couple handling some of his babies while he was looking at theirs, 10 days later his entire clutch was ill and dying, it passes that easily! Another breeder at a show in NY, returned from the show and had babies dying that tested positive within 2 weeks (since that time, 2 other breeders that attend the same show have also lost their colony of dragons to the virus)"

In 2005 it was noted by Cheri Smith that "Sibling clutches have been tested and some are positive, some are negative in the same clutch. This leads to the theory that some are infected when the eggs pass through the cloaca and pick up viral particles or some are infected before they are shelled when others are spared."

== Symptoms ==
Symptoms of Agamid Adenovirus 1 in bearded dragons are variable, and range from asymptomatic infection to enteritis to death. It is probable that there is a relationship between dose of infection and clinical disease. Coinfections with other agents such as Isospora amphibolouri, a coccidia, and dependovirus, a genus of parvovirus, may play roles in clinical presentation of disease. Husbandry factors such as temperature range, diet, population density, and other stressors also are likely to play significant roles in clinical presentation.

== Testing ==
- Electron Microscopy or ‘EM’ testing is available through the University of Illinois, College of Veterinary Medicine, Center for Microscopic Imaging (CMI)
- Polymerase chain reaction or 'PCR' based testing is available through the University of Florida- this laboratory requires samples to be submitted by a veterinarian.
