= 2022 hepatitis of unknown origin in children =

Disease outbreak

- Map
- Disease: Acute hepatitis
- Date: October 2021 – September 2022
- Confirmed cases: 895
- Deaths: 18

In 2022, cases of severe paediatric acute hepatitis of unknown origin (AHUO or PAHUO) were reported to the World Health Organization (WHO) from several countries. The outbreak led to a significant interest in adenoviruses, though as of 2023 no definite explanation has been agreed on the cause of the hepatitis.

In October 2021, a cluster of cases of severe hepatitis of unknown origin were identified at a children's hospital in the U.S. state of Alabama. Between 5 April and 8 July 2022, 35 countries had reported 1,010 probable cases of acute hepatitis of unknown cause in children. WHO guidance has since recommended the testing of several other viruses in children aged 16 years or younger presenting with an acute hepatitis not caused by hepatitis viruses A–E, where serum aminotransferase levels are higher than 500 IU/L, and other local causes of hepatitis have been excluded.

It is not uncommon for the cause of some hepatitis cases in children to remain unknown. As of September 2022, the cause of the rise in cases remains unknown, although it has been suggested by some UK-studies that a co-infection with adeno-associated virus 2 (AAV2) and adenovirus or less likely herpesvirus might have caused some.

== Case definition ==
A probable case as defined by the ECDC and WHO, is a person 16 years old or younger since 1 October 2021, who presents with an acute hepatitis that tests negative for hepatitis viruses A, B, C, D and E, and has a higher than 500 IU/L of the liver enzyme aspartate transaminase. Hepatitis due to drug toxicity, and inherited metabolic disorders, or autoimmune disorders are not included. Worldwide, not all countries may have used the same criteria.

== History ==
From October 2021 to February 2022, nine children, all at the Children's of Alabama hospital, were identified with severe hepatitis of unknown origin. All were previously healthy and the CDC was notified in November.

On 31 March 2022, Public Health Scotland (PHS) were notified of five children aged three-to-five-years that were diagnosed with severe hepatitis of unknown origin at the Royal Hospital for Children. On 5 April, the International Health Regulations (IHR) National Focal Point (NFP) for the UK informed the WHO of 10 cases of sudden severe hepatitis of unknown origin in children across Scotland, one whose symptoms began in January while the others first became unwell in March. They were previously healthy. By 8 April 2022, 74 cases had been identified in the UK, with six requiring a liver transplantation. Subsequently, a few cases were reported in Ireland and Spain. By 21 April, there were 114 cases in the UK.

By 23 April 2022, 11 European countries and the US had reported at least 169 cases of sudden onset hepatitis in children under the age of 16-years, with most cases in the UK. The common hepatitis causing viruses, A, B, C, D and E, were excluded in all 169 cases. Most did not have a fever, and many presented with diarrhoea, vomiting and abdominal pain, before finding raised levels of liver enzymes in their blood and jaundice. According to the WHO, "It is not yet clear if there has been an increase in hepatitis cases, or an increase in awareness of hepatitis cases that occur at the expected rate but go undetected." The WHO confirmed one child death, 17 liver transplantations and that the youngest child affected was one month old. At least 74 tested positive for adenovirus, 20 that were tested were positive for SARS-CoV-2, and of those tested 19 were detected with both a SARS-CoV-2 and adenovirus co-infection. Most affected children had not received a COVID-19 vaccine. The WHO's report of 23 April confirmed that 114 have been reported in the UK and Northern Ireland, 13 in Spain, 12 in Israel, nine in the US, six in Denmark, less than five in Ireland, four in the Netherlands, four in Italy, two in Norway, two in France, one in Romania, and one in Belgium. The WHO initiated an investigation into the outbreaks.

By 25 April 2022 most cases were confirmed as under the age of five-years and 10 had required a liver transplantation. There were no deaths in the UK. On 26 April 2022, the Public Health Agency of Canada announced it was investigating reports of the disease affecting children in the country. The Guardian also reported that cases have been reported from countries in Asia; specifically in Japan, where a child was flagged for the disease on April 21, and in Singapore, on April 30. On 30 April 2022, Singapore's Ministry of Health reported that a 10-month old infant with acute hepatitis of unknown cause was hospitalised on 25 April.

As of 1 May 2022, the WHO had received reports of at least 228 probable cases from 20 countries, with over 50 cases under investigation. On 2 May 2022, Indonesia's Ministry of Health reported that 3 children died of acute hepatitis in April 2022. On 6 May 2022, Malaysia reported a case of hepatitis of unknown origin in a 4-year-old boy who sought treatment in March 2022 and subsequently underwent liver transplantation. Also on 6 May, the CDC said that it is investigating 109 children with hepatitis of unknown origin, including five recorded deaths. More than 90% of the children were hospitalized and 14% received a liver transplant due to liver failure. The majority of children have recovered. As of 11 May, the EDCP estimated around 450 reported cases worldwide.

== Statistics ==
Cases by country and territory
Country/Territory	Cases	Deaths	Last Update
Argentina	8		10 May 2022
Austria	3		17 June 2022
Belgium	14		17 June 2022
Brazil	88	7	13 June 2022
Bulgaria	1		17 June 2022
Canada	7		10 May 2022
Costa Rica	2		10 May 2022
Cyprus	2		17 June 2022
Denmark	7		17 June 2022
France	7		17 June 2022
Germany	1		5 May 2022
Greece	9		17 June 2022
Indonesia	5		10 May 2022
Ireland	14		17 June 2022
Israel	5		17 June 2022
Italy	33		17 June 2022
Japan	162	1	22 August 2023
Latvia	1		17 June 2022
Moldova	1		17 June 2022
Netherlands	15		17 June 2022
Norway	5		17 June 2022
Palestine	1		10 May 2022
Panama	1		10 May 2022
Poland	8		17 June 2022
Portugal	15		17 June 2022
Romania	8		5 May 2022
Serbia	1		17 June 2022
Singapore	1		10 May 2022
South Korea	1		10 May 2022
Spain	37		17 June 2022
Sweden	9		17 June 2022
United Kingdom	258		21 June 2022
United States	296	11	24 June 2022

== Symptoms ==
Those affected by the disease experience the following symptoms:

- Nausea
- Abdominal pain
- Vomiting
- Diarrhea
- Jaundice

== Possible causes ==
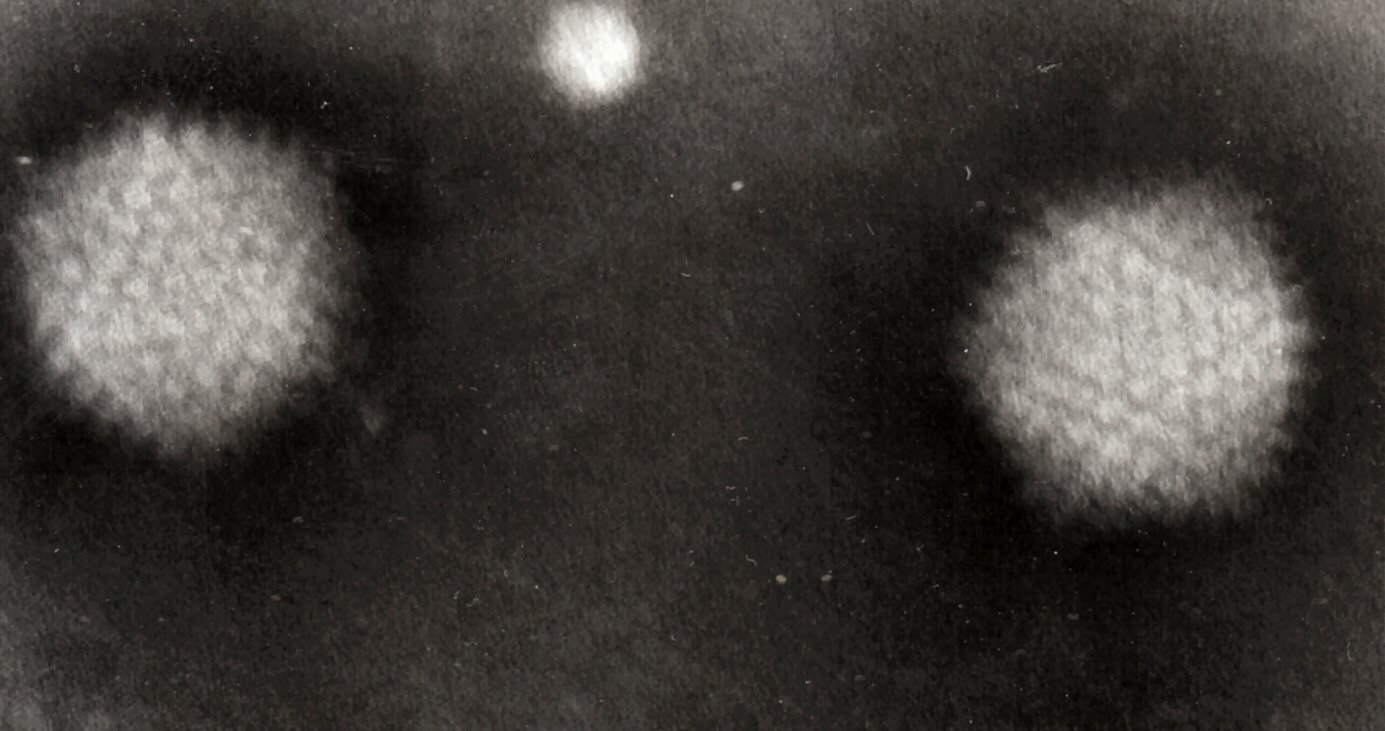
Transmission electron micrograph of two adenovirus particles

The cause of the outbreak remains unknown. The leading hypothesis is a link to human adenovirus infection, particularly serotype F41. As of May 2022, laboratory testing showed infection with human adenovirus in about three quarters of cases. This serotype has previously been associated with gastrointestinal symptoms, but not hepatitis. This suggests there is an additional co-factor at play. In August 2022, 9 children in a U.S. case series of hepatitis of unknown cause and 27 of 30 children in a U.K. case series with hepatitis of unknown cause who underwent molecular testing tested positive for human adenovirus 41 in a sample. It remained unclear, however, whether human adenovirus 41 was the cause.

One possibility is that restrictions imposed during the COVID-19 pandemic led to young children being exposed to adenovirus at a later point than normal in their lives, leading to a stronger immune response. The increased susceptibility to a gut-tropic adenovirus amongst young children could be a consequence of a lower level of respiratory adenovirus circulation in the last 2 years.

Another co-factor might be prior or concurrent infection with COVID-19 or to another virus or environmental agent. No notable exposures relating to travel, parental occupation, diet, exposure to animals or to toxicants have been recorded in association with cases to date. Another suggestion is that there has been a change in the genetic make-up of adenovirus, so that it causes liver inflammation more readily, although data is lacking to support this.

According to the WHO, these theories require further investigation.

No link to COVID-19 or other vaccinations, which use adenovirus as a vaccine vector has been seen, particularly since the majority of cases occurred in an age group of children which were not vaccinated against COVID-19. This observation almost excludes the possibility of COVID-19 vaccination playing a role in the outbreak.

== See also ==
- Gastrointestinal disease
