= Siadenovirus =

Virus classification
- (unranked): Virus
- Realm: Varidnaviria
- Kingdom: Bamfordvirae
- Phylum: Preplasmiviricota
- Class: Pharingeaviricetes
- Order: Rowavirales
- Family: Adenoviridae
- Genus: Siadenovirus

Genus of viruses

Siadenovirus is a genus of viruses, in the family Adenoviridae. Vertebrates serve as natural hosts. There are 14 species in this genus.

== Taxonomy ==
The genus contains the following species, listed by scientific name and followed by the exemplar virus of the species:

- Siadenovirus carbocapituli, Great tit adenovirus 3
- Siadenovirus cinerei, Psittacine adenovirus 2
- Siadenovirus columbae, Pigeon adenovirus 4
- Siadenovirus coturnicis, Quail adenovirus 1
- Siadenovirus gallopavotertii, Turkey adenovirus 3
- Siadenovirus paridae, Great tit adenovirus 1
- Siadenovirus ranae, Frog adenovirus 1
- Siadenovirus raptoris, Raptor adenovirus 1
- Siadenovirus sanguineae, Psittacine adenovirus 7
- Siadenovirus spheniscidae, Chinstrap penguin adenovirus 2
- Siadenovirus stercorariidae, South Polar skua adenovirus 1
- Siadenovirus sulawense, Sulawesi adenovirus 1 (Chinese soft-shelled turtle adenovirus)
- Siadenovirus uriae, Common murre adenovirus
- Siadenovirus viridis, Psittacine adenovirus 5

== Structure ==
Viruses in Siadenovirus are non-enveloped, with icosahedral geometries, and T=25 symmetry. The diameter is around 90 nm. Genomes are linear and non-segmented, around 35-36kb in length. The genome codes for 25 proteins.

Genus	Structure	Symmetry	Capsid	Genomic arrangement	Genomic segmentation
Siadenovirus	Polyhedral	Pseudo T=25	Non-enveloped	Linear	Monopartite

== Life cycle ==
Viral replication is nuclear. Entry into the host cell is achieved by attachment of the viral fiber glycoproteins to host receptors, which mediates endocytosis. Replication follows the DNA strand displacement model. DNA-templated transcription, with some alternative splicing mechanism is the method of transcription. The virus exits the host cell by nuclear envelope breakdown, viroporins, and lysis. Vertebrates serve as the natural host.

Genus	Host details	Tissue tropism	Entry details	Release details	Replication site	Assembly site	Transmission
Siadenovirus	Vertebrates	None	Glycoprotiens	Lysis	Nucleus	Nucleus	Unknown
