= Ichtadenovirus =

Virus classification
- (unranked): Virus
- Realm: Varidnaviria
- Kingdom: Bamfordvirae
- Phylum: Preplasmiviricota
- Class: Pharingeaviricetes
- Order: Rowavirales
- Family: Adenoviridae
- Genus: Ichtadenovirus

Genus of viruses

Ichtadenovirus is a genus of viruses, in the family Adenoviridae. Fish serve as natural hosts. There is only one species in this genus: White sturgeon adenovirus 1 (Ichtadenovirus acipenseris).

== Structure ==
Viruses in Ichtadenovirus are non-enveloped, with icosahedral geometries, and T=25 symmetry. The diameter is around 90 nm. Genomes are linear and non-segmented, around 35-36kb in length. The genome codes for 40 proteins.

Genus	Structure	Symmetry	Capsid	Genomic arrangement	Genomic segmentation
Ichtadenovirus	Polyhedral	Pseudo T=58	Non-enveloped	Linear	Monopartite

== Life cycle ==
Viral replication is nuclear. Entry into the host cell is achieved by attachment of the viral fiber glycoproteins to host receptors, which mediates endocytosis. Replication follows the DNA strand displacement model. DNA-templated transcription, with some alternative splicing mechanism is the method of transcription. The virus exits the host cell by nuclear envelope breakdown, viroporins, and lysis. Fishes serve as the natural host.

Genus	Host details	Tissue tropism	Entry details	Release details	Replication site	Assembly site	Transmission
Ichtadenovirus	Fish	None	Glycoprotiens	Lysis	Nucleus	Nucleus	Unknown
