= Capsomere =

Subunit of a capsid

The capsomere is a subunit of the capsid, an outer covering of protein that protects the genetic material of a virus. Capsomeres self-assemble to form the capsid.

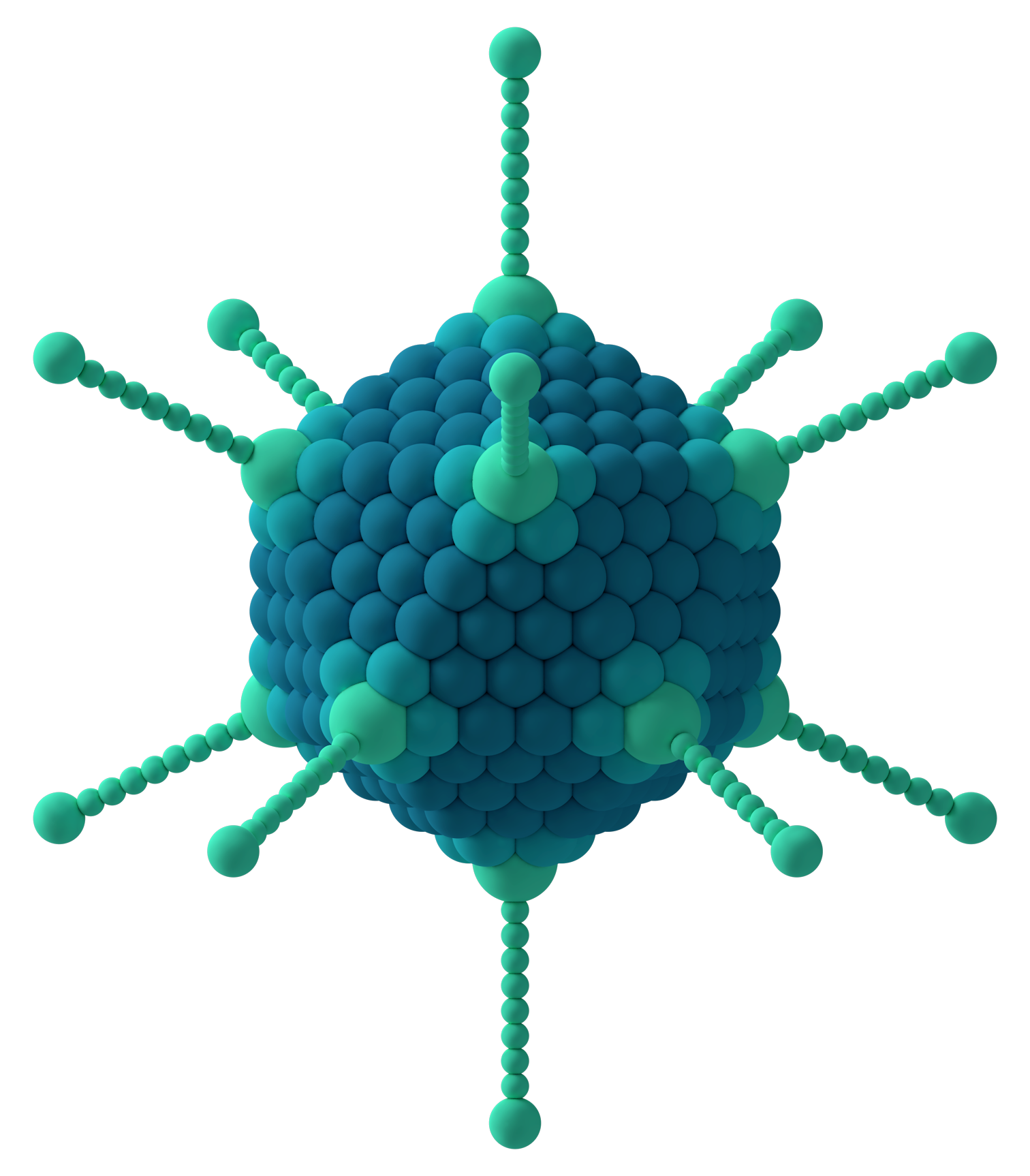
In this diagram of an Adenovirus, the capsid molecules are clearly visible.

Subunits called protomers aggregate to form capsomeres. Various arrangements of capsomeres are: 1) Icosahedral, 2) Helical, and 3) Complex.

1) Icosahedral- An icosahedron is a polyhedron with 12 vertices and 20 faces. Two types of capsomeres constitute the icosahedral capsid: pentagonal (pentons) at the vertices and hexagonal (hexons) at the faces. There are always twelve pentons, but the number of hexons varies among virus groups. In electron micrographs, capsomeres are recognized as regularly spaced rings with a central hole.

2) Helical- The protomers are not grouped in capsomeres, but are bound to each other so as to form a ribbon-like structure. This structure folds into a helix because the protomers are thicker at one end than at the other. The diameter of the helical capsid is determined by characteristics of its protomers, while its length is determined by the length of the nucleic acid it encloses.

3) Complex- e.g., that exhibited by poxvirus and rhabdovirus. This group comprises all those viruses which do not fit into either of the above two groups. When the viral particle has entered a host cell, the host cellular enzymes digest the capsid and its constituent capsomeres, thereby exposing the naked genetic material (DNA/RNA) of the virus, which subsequently enters the replication cycle.

The capsomeres protect against physical, chemical, and enzymatic damage and are multiply redundant; having a few protein subunits that are repeated. This is because the viral genome is being as economic as possible by only needing a few protein codons to make a large structure. One of the major functions of a capsid is to introduce the enclosed viral genome into host cells by adsorbing readily to host cell surfaces.
