= Adenovirus genome =

Adenovirus genomes are linear, non-segmented double-stranded (ds) DNA molecules that are typically 26-46 Kbp long, containing 23-46 protein-coding genes. The example used for the following description is Human adenovirus E, a mastadenovirus with a 36 Kbp genome containing 38 protein-coding genes. While the precise number and identity of genes varies among adenoviruses, the basic principles of genome organization and the functions of most of the genes described in this article are shared among all adenoviruses.

== Transcription units ==
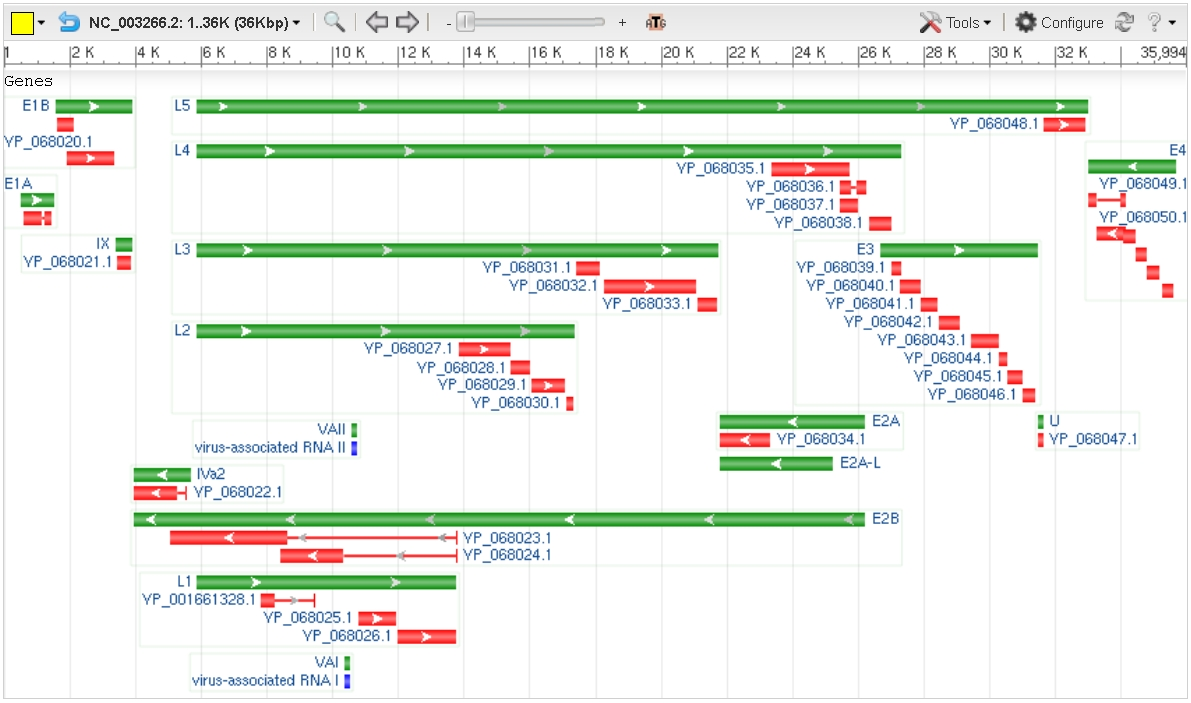
Transcription units (in green) and genes (protein-coding genes in red, other genes in blue) of human adenovirus E genome

The 38 genes in the Human adenovirus E genome are organized in 17 transcription units, each containing 1-8 coding sequences. Alternative splicing during processing of the pre-mRNAs produced by each transcription unit enable multiple different mRNAs to be produced from one transcription unit.

The E1A, E1B, E2A, E2B, E3, and E4 transcription units are successively transcribed early in the viral reproductive cycle. The proteins coded for by genes within these transcription units are mostly involved in regulation of viral transcription, in replication of viral DNA, and in suppression of the host response to infection.

The L1-L5 transcription units are transcribed later in the viral reproductive cycle, and code mostly for proteins that make up components of the viral capsid or are involved in assembly of the capsid. The L1-L5 transcription units are all regulated by the same promoter region and share the same transcription start site. As a result, transcription of all five late transcription units begins at the same point in the viral reproductive cycle.

Transcription of pre-mRNAs beginning at the late promoter is randomly terminated at one of five termination sites, producing a population of transcripts of five different lengths. The pre-mRNAs of any given length are then alternatively spliced to produce 1-4 different mRNAs coding for a corresponding number of proteins.

== Protein-coding genes ==
The names, locations, and properties of the 38 protein-coding genes in the Human Adenovirus E genome are given in the following table.

Protein name	Protein identifier	Transcription unit	Start base	Stop base	Strand	Length (amino acids)
control protein E1A	YP_068018.1	E1A	576	1441	+	257
control protein E1B 19K	YP_068019.1	E1B	1600	2115	+	171
control protein E1B 55K	YP_068020.1	E1B	1905	3356	+	483
capsid protein IX	YP_068021.1	IX	3441	3869	+	142
encapsidation protein IVa2	YP_068022.1	IVa2	3930	5554	-	448
DNA polymerase	YP_068023.1	E2B	5033	13773	-	1193
protein 13.6K	YP_001661328.1	L1	7814	9476	+	139
terminal protein precursor pTP	YP_068024.1	E2B	8404	13773	-	642
encapsidation protein 52K	YP_068025.1	L1	10765	11937	+	390
capsid protein precursor pIIIa	YP_068026.1	L1	11961	13736	+	591
penton base (capsid protein III)	YP_068027.1	L2	13815	15422	+	535
core protein precursor pVII	YP_068028.1	L2	15426	16007	+	193
core protein V	YP_068029.1	L2	16055	17080	+	341
core protein precursor pX	YP_068030.1	L2	17103	17336	+	77
capsid protein precursor pVI	YP_068031.1	L3	17413	18141	+	242
hexon (capsid protein II)	YP_068032.1	L3	18248	21058	+	936
protease	YP_068033.1	L3	21082	21702	+	206
single-stranded DNA-binding protein	YP_068034.1	E2A-L	21774	23312	-	512
hexon assembly protein 100K	YP_068035.1	L4	23341	25716	+	791
protein 33K	YP_068036.1	L4	25439	26252	+	214
encapsidation protein 22K	YP_068037.1	L4	25439	25978	+	179
capsid protein precursor pVIII	YP_068038.1	L4	26321	27004	+	227
control protein E3 12.5K	YP_068039.1	E3	27005	27325	+	106
membrane glycoprotein E3 CR1-alpha	YP_068040.1	E3	27279	27911	+	210
membrane glycoprotein E3 gp19K	YP_068041.1	E3	27893	28417	+	174
membrane glycoprotein E3 CR1-beta	YP_068042.1	E3	28449	29111	+	220
membrane glycoprotein E3 CR1-delta	YP_068043.1	E3	29440	30264	+	274
membrane protein E3 RID-alpha	YP_068044.1	E3	30273	30548	+	91
membrane protein E3 RID-beta	YP_068045.1	E3	30554	30994	+	146
control protein E3 14.7K	YP_068046.1	E3	30987	31388	+	133
protein U	YP_068047.1	U	31481	31632	-	50
fiber (capsid protein IV)	YP_068048.1	L5	31649	32926	+	425
control protein E4orf6/7	YP_068049.1	E4	33022	34169	-	141
control protein E4 34K	YP_068050.1	E4	33270	34169	-	299
control protein E4orf4	YP_068051.1	E4	34072	34440	-	122
control protein E4orf3	YP_068052.1	E4	34449	34802	-	117
control protein E4orf2	YP_068053.1	E4	34799	35188	-	129
control protein E4orf1	YP_068054.1	E4	35236	35610	-	124

The functions of many adenovirus proteins are known:

- Structural proteins include capsid proteins II (hexon), III (penton base), IIIa, IV (fiber), VI, VIII, and IX; and core proteins V, VII, X, and the terminal protein TP.
- Encapsidation proteins IVa2, 52K, and L1, and hexon assembly protein 100K are involved in assembly of viral capsids.
- The L3 protease cleaves viral precursor proteins pTP, pVI, pVII, pVIII, and IIIa to produce the mature viral proteins.
- Control protein E1A activates transcription of a number of viral genes as well as genes of the host cell.
- Control protein E1B 19K suppresses apoptosis by mimicking the action of cellular protein Bcl-2.
- Control protein E1B 55K binds to and inactivates the transcriptional regulator p53, thus blocking transcription of genes normally activated by p53 and contributing to the suppression of apoptosis.
- The three proteins coded for by the E2A and E2B transcription units are all involved in replication of viral DNA. Adenovirus DNA replication begins at each end of the viral DNA, using the TP protein (rather than RNA) as a primer, so the viral DNA polymerase replicates every base of the genome.
- Membrane protein E3 RID-alpha and membrane protein E3 RID-beta performs a variety of molecular functions that contribute to inhibiting apoptosis.
- CR1 beta membrane glycoprotein modulates the host immune response.
- Membrane glycoprotein E3 gp19K inhibits the insertion of class I MHC proteins in the host-cell membrane, thereby preventing T-cell lymphocytes from recognizing that the host cell has been infected by a virus.
- Control protein E3 14.7K protects the virus from host antiviral responses.
- The control proteins of the E4 transcription unit are involved in regulating transcription of viral DNA.
