= Infectobesity =

Hypothesis of pathogens being a cause of obesity in humans

The term "infectobesity" refers to the hypothesis that obesity in humans can be caused by pathogenic organisms, and the emerging field of medical research that studies the relationship between pathogens and weight gain. The term was coined in 2001 by Dr. Nikhil V. Dhurandhar, at the Pennington Biomedical Research Center.

== Bacteria ==
The study of the effect of infectious agents on metabolism is still in its early stages. Gut flora has been shown to differ between lean and obese humans. There is an indication that gut flora in obese and lean individuals can affect the metabolic potential. This apparent alteration of the metabolic potential is believed to confer a greater capacity to harvest energy contributing to obesity. Whether these differences are the direct cause, or the result of obesity has yet to be determined unequivocally.

A possible mechanistic explanation linking gut flora to obesity involves short chain fatty acids. Humans are unable to digest complex polysaccharides and rely on gut microbiota to ferment these polysaccharides into short chain fatty acids. In contrast to polysaccharides, humans can use short chain fatty acids as a source of energy. In addition, research in rodents has indicated that the abundance of short chain fatty acids in the gut can affect the blood levels of gut hormones such as GLP-1, GLP-2 and peptide YY. These changes in gut hormone levels have shown to affect glucose tolerance, insulin signaling, intestinal barrier function and have led to weight gain in rodents. Dietary diversity is associated in humans and animals with a healthier gut microbiota, and thus may be necessary for effective long-term health improvement strategies but is often overlooked in animal studies. Furthermore, administration of antibiotics to rodents alters gut microbiota composition and ensuing changes in gut hormone levels are also detected. These results may provide the mechanistic explanation for the claim that antibiotics can lead to obesity in humans. Yet, whether these findings can be replicated in human studies remains to be seen.

== Viruses ==
An association between viruses and obesity has been found in humans, as well as a number of different animal species. The amount that these associations may have contributed to the rising rate of obesity is yet to be determined. A fat virus is the popular name for the notion that some forms of obesity in humans and animals have a viral source.

== See also ==
- Causes of obesity
- Clinical significance of Bacillota
- Obesogen
- Systemic inflammation and obesity
- Adenovirus serotype 36
