= List of zoonotic primate viruses =

The following list of primate viruses is not exhaustive. Many viruses specific to non-human primates nevertheless are known to jump and infect humans and, thus, become known as zoonoses.

Simian virus name	Primary host	Human transmission case	Severity in humans	Severity in monkeys
Monkeypox virus ( Poxviridae )	Monkeys	Yes	to 10% mortality (skin Rash)	Mild infection
Chimpanzee herpesvirus	Chimp	??	??	Latent infection
Langur herpesvirus	Langur	??	??	Latent infection
Lymphotrophic polyomavirus (LPV)	Monkeys	Yes (common)	??	??
Herpes B virus	Macaque	Yes (rare)	High mortality rate	Latent infection
Mason-Pfizer monkey virus ( Betaretrovirus ) (MPMV)	Monkeys	No	Unknown	Immunodeficiency/cancer in Old World monkeys
Simian foamy virus retroviridae (SFV)	Monkeys	Yes	Unknown	Latent infection
Simian immunodeficiency virus (SIV) retroviridae	Monkeys	Yes	Unknown	Immunodeficiency in macaques
Simian hemorrhagic fever virus (SHFV) Arteriviridae	Patas	No	Unknown	Deadly in macaques
Simian varicella virus (SVV) Herpesviridae	Monkeys	No	Unknown	Rash and latent infection
SV40 Polyomavirus	Monkeys	Yes (common)	May contribute to the development of mesothelioma	Cancer
Titi monkey adenovirus (TmAdV)	Titi monkey	Yes (rare)	Respiratory illness	Deadly
Zika fever	Mangabey, chimpanzees, apes, baboons	Yes	Viral disease	
