= Bovine adenovirus =

Scientific classification
- (unranked): Virus
- Realm: Varidnaviria
- Kingdom: Bamfordvirae
- Phylum: Preplasmiviricota
- Class: Pharingeaviricetes
- Order: Rowavirales
- Family: Adenoviridae

Groups included
- Bovine mastadenovirus A; Bovine mastadenovirus B; Bovine mastadenovirus C; Bovine atadenovirus D; Bovine atadenovirus E

Cladistically included but traditionally excluded taxa
- Other adenoviruses

Species of virus

Bovine Adenovirus, also known as BAdV, is a member of the Adenoviridae family that causes disease in cattle. There are 10 serotypes recognised and the virus had a worldwide distribution—being particularly common in Africa and Central America.

Infection usually results in disease of the gastrointestinal or respiratory tract. Infection may also cause ocular or generalised signs and may contribute to enzootic pneumonia, depending on the serotype of the virus. However, infection may not always result in disease as the virus can be isolated in healthy cattle.

Once infected, the cattle shed the virus for approximately 10 days in the respiratory secretions or feces—some cattle may become persistently infected, resulting in excretion of the virus for much longer.

== Clinical Signs & Diagnosis ==
Clinical signs are more common in younger animals as the levels of maternal antibodies begin to wane, from as young as two weeks old.

Gastrointestinal signs include diarrhoea, a reduced appetite and abdominal distension. Respiratory signs include coughing, serous nasal discharge, dyspnea and tachypnea. Signs may worsen if a secondary infection occurs. The classical signs of a generalised disease, such as pyrexia, weight loss, depression, weakness, lymphadenopathy and lethargy may also be seen. Sudden death is also reported.

Definitive diagnosis can only be achieved by measuring a fourfold rise in antibody titre over the course of the disease. Presence of the virus alone cannot confirm diagnosis due to its presence in healthy cattle. Virus isolation is the only way to identify the serotype of the adenovirus. Postmortem examination may reveal lesions in the gastrointestinal or respiratory tract and enlarged lymph nodes.

== Treatment & Control ==
Cattle should be treated symptomatically when possible. Antibiotic treatment may also be indicated to prevent secondary infection.

The disease can be controlled by ensuring that calves receive adequate colostrum at birth. Management factors such as separating different age groups, and providing good ventilation and clean bedding also reduce disease incidence.

Vaccination of young cattle can reduce the severity and incidence of disease. Multiple doses are required and are usually combined with other agents. The vaccine is not available worldwide.
