= Infectious canine hepatitis =

Canine adenovirus 1

Virus classification
- (unranked): Virus
- Realm: Varidnaviria
- Kingdom: Bamfordvirae
- Phylum: Preplasmiviricota
- Class: Pharingeaviricetes
- Order: Rowavirales
- Family: Adenoviridae
- Genus: Mastadenovirus
- Species: Mastadenovirus canidae

Synonyms
- Canine adenovirus A; Canine adenovirus; Canine adenovirus 1 (CAV-1); Canine adenovirus 2 (CAV-2)

Viral disease of canines

Infectious canine hepatitis (ICH) is an acute liver infection in dogs caused by Canine adenovirus 1 (CAV-1). Canine mastadenovirus A also causes disease in wolves, coyotes, and bears, and encephalitis in foxes. The virus is spread in the feces, urine, blood, saliva, and nasal discharge of infected dogs. It is contracted through the mouth or nose; the virus then replicates in the tonsils before infecting the liver and kidneys. The incubation period is 4 to 9 days.

Symptoms include fever, depression, loss of appetite, coughing, and a tender abdomen. Corneal edema and signs of liver disease, such as jaundice, vomiting, and hepatic encephalopathy, may also occur. Severe cases develop bleeding disorders, which can cause hematomas to form in the mouth. Death can occur secondary to this or the liver disease. However, most dogs recover after a brief illness, although chronic corneal edema and kidney lesions may persist.

Diagnosis is made by recognizing the combination of symptoms and abnormal blood tests that occur in infectious canine hepatitis. A rising antibody titer to CAV-1 is also seen. The disease can be confused with canine parvovirus because both cause a low white blood cell count and bloody diarrhea in young, unvaccinated dogs.

Treatment is symptomatic. Most dogs recover spontaneously without treatment. Prevention is through vaccination (ATCvet code QI07AA05 (WHO) and various combination vaccines). Most combination vaccines for dogs contain a modified canine adenovirus type-2. CAV-2 is one of the causes of respiratory infections in dogs, but it is similar enough to CAV-1 that the vaccine for one creates immunity for both. CAV-2 vaccine is much less likely to cause side effects than CAV-1 vaccine. One study has shown the vaccine to have a duration of immunity of at least four years.

CAV-1 is destroyed in the environment by steam cleaning and quaternary ammonium compounds. Otherwise, the virus can survive in the environment for months in the right conditions. It can also be released in the urine of a recovered dog for up to a year.

== See also ==
- Hepacivirus A
