= Federal Office for Transport =

Federal Office for Transport (Bundesanstalt für Verkehr, BAV) is a government agency of Austria. Its head office is Vienna. It is subordinate to the Ministry for Transport, Innovation and Technology.

A part of this agency is the Federal Safety Investigation Authority (SIA; German: Sicherheitsuntersuchungsstelle; SUB). The SIA is an independent authority to investigate accidents and incidents in the fields of civil aviation, railway, cablecars and shipping.

== Investigations ==
- Hapag-Lloyd Flight 3378
