= Photoreceptor =

Photoreceptor can refer to:

In anatomy/cell biology:

- Photoreceptor cell, a photosensitive cell in the retina of vertebrate eyes
- Simple eye in invertebrates (Ocellus), photoreceptor organ ("simple eye") of invertebrates often composed of a few sensory cells and a single lens
- Eyespot apparatus (microbial photoreceptor), the photoreceptor organelle of a unicellular organism that allows for phototaxis

In biochemistry:

- Photoreceptor protein, a chromoprotein that responds to being exposed to a certain wavelength of light by initiating a signal transduction cascade
- Photopigment, an unstable pigment that undergoes a physical or chemical change upon absorbing a particular wavelength of light; also see
  - Photosynthetic pigment, molecules involved in transducing light into chemical energy

In technology:

- Photodetector or photosensor, a device that detects light by capturing photons

== See also ==
- Eye (disambiguation)
