= Stockholm Radio =

Coast radio station in Sweden

Logo

Stockholm Radio is the only remaining coast radio station in Sweden. It was established as Stavsnäs Radio in 1937 (89 years ago). The station is located at Karlavägen in Stockholm. While the infrastructure is owned by the Swedish Maritime Administration, Stockholm Radio is private and operated by Viamare. The Aero Radio service is run since 2003 by Aviolinx.
