= Mastadenovirus =

Virus classification
- (unranked): Virus
- Realm: Varidnaviria
- Kingdom: Bamfordvirae
- Phylum: Preplasmiviricota
- Class: Pharingeaviricetes
- Order: Rowavirales
- Family: Adenoviridae
- Genus: Mastadenovirus

Species
- See text

Genus of viruses

Mastadenovirus is a genus of viruses in the family Adenoviridae. Humans and other mammals serve as natural hosts. There are 79 species in this genus. The genus as a whole includes many very common causes of human infection, estimated to be responsible for 2 to 5% of all respiratory infections, as well as gastrointestinal and eye infections. Symptoms are usually mild.

Canine adenovirus 1 (CAdV-1) can lead to death in puppies, or encephalitis in other carnivore species.

== Etymology ==
The name Mastadenovirus is derived from the Greek word mastos 'breast' (hence mammal) and adenovirus, named for the human adenoids, which the virus was first isolated from.

== Structure ==
Viruses in Mastadenovirus are non-enveloped, with icosahedral geometries, and T=25 symmetry. The diameter is around 90 nm. Genomes are linear and non-segmented, around 35-36kb in length. The genome codes for 40 proteins.

Genus	Structure	Symmetry	Capsid	Genomic arrangement	Genomic segmentation
Mastadenovirus	Polyhedral	Pseudo T=59	Non-enveloped	Linear	Monopartite

== Life cycle ==
Viral replication is nuclear. Entry into the host cell is achieved by attachment of the viral fibers to the host CAR adhesion receptor. Subsequent binding of the penton protein to host integrin entry receptors mediates internalization into the host cell by clathrin-mediated endocytosis of the virus and fiber shedding. Some serotypes also seem to use macropinocytosis. Disruption of host endosomal membrane by lytic protein VI releases the viral capsid in the cytosol. Microtubular transport toward nucleus of the viral genome still protected by the core protein VII and a partial capsid mainly composed of hexons and protein IX. Docking at the NPC and capsid disruption. Import of the viral genome into host nucleus mediated by core protein VII. Transcription of early genes (E genes) by host RNA pol II: these proteins optimize the cellular milieu for viral replication, and counteract a variety of antiviral defenses. Intermediate genes activate replication of the DNA genome by DNA strand displacement in the nucleus. Expression of L4-22K and L4-33K causes early to late switch. Transcription of late genes (L genes) by host RNA pol II, mostly encoding structural proteins. Host translation shutoff performed by the viral 100K protein. Assembly of new virions in the nucleus. Virions are released by lysis of the cell. Virion maturation by the viral proteasehost receptors, which mediates clathrin-mediated endocytosis. Replication follows the DNA strand displacement model. DNA-templated transcription, with some alternative splicing mechanism is the method of transcription. Translation takes place by ribosomal shunting. The virus exits the host cell by nuclear envelope breakdown, viroporins, and lysis. Human, mammals, and vertebrates serve as the natural host. Transmission routes are fecal-oral and respiratory.

Genus	Host details	Tissue tropism	Entry details	Release details	Replication site	Assembly site	Transmission
Mastadenovirus	Humans; mammals	None	Glycoprotiens	Lysis	Nucleus	Nucleus	Unknown

== Species ==
The genus contains the following species, listed by scientific name and followed by the exemplar virus of the species:

- Mastadenovirus adami, Human adenovirus 12
- Mastadenovirus aegyptiaci, Egyptian fruit bat adenovirus
- Mastadenovirus aethiopiense, Simian adenovirus 61
- Mastadenovirus alienum, Simian adenovirus 16
- Mastadenovirus arundinis, Greater bamboo bat adenovirus
- Mastadenovirus arvicolinae, Vole adenovirus 1
- Mastadenovirus asiense, Bat adenovirus Vs9
- Mastadenovirus bestiae, Simian adenovirus 60
- Mastadenovirus blackbeardi, Human adenovirus 3
- Mastadenovirus bosdecimum, Bovine adenovirus 10
- Mastadenovirus bosprimum, Bovine adenovirus 1
- Mastadenovirus bostertium, Bovine adenovirus 3
- Mastadenovirus bovidae, Bovine adenovirus 2
- Mastadenovirus caesari, Human adenovirus 2
- Mastadenovirus canidae, Canine adenovirus 1
- Mastadenovirus capreoli, Roe deer adenovirus 1
- Mastadenovirus cardiodermatis, Heart-nosed bat adenovirus
- Mastadenovirus caviae, Guinea pig adenovirus 1
- Mastadenovirus cervi, Deer adenovirus 2, also called Odocoileus adenovirus 2
- Mastadenovirus chalinolobi, Gould's wattled bat adenovirus 1
- Mastadenovirus chlorocebi, Simian adenovirus 18
- Mastadenovirus cordis, Murine adenovirus 3
- Mastadenovirus cynocephali, Simian adenovirus 19
- Mastadenovirus delphini, Bottlenose dolphin adenovirus 1
- Mastadenovirus delphinidae, Bottlenose dolphin adenovirus 2
- Mastadenovirus desmodi, Vampire bat adenovirus
- Mastadenovirus dipodomysis, Kangaroo rat adenovirus
- Mastadenovirus dominans, Human adenovirus 9
- Mastadenovirus eidoli, Straw-colored fruit bat adenovirus
- Mastadenovirus eliomysis, Garden dormouse adenovirus 1
- Mastadenovirus encephalomyelitidis, Murine adenovirus 1
- Mastadenovirus eothenomysis, Kachin red-backed vole adenovirus 1 (Yunan rodent adenovirus 2)
- Mastadenovirus equi, Equine adenovirus 1
- Mastadenovirus equidae, Equine adenovirus 2
- Mastadenovirus exoticum, Human adenovirus 4
- Mastadenovirus faecale, Human adenovirus 40
- Mastadenovirus ferrumequini, Greater horseshoe bat adenovirus MAG47
- Mastadenovirus flavi, Simian adenovirus 55
- Mastadenovirus fructus, Leschenault's rousette adenovirus
- Mastadenovirus geladae, Simian adenovirus 65
- Mastadenovirus himalaiense, Himalayan wiskered bat adenovirus 1
- Mastadenovirus humile, Bat adenovirus 8
- Mastadenovirus hylobatidae, Simian adenovirus 57 (Gibbon adenovirus)
- Mastadenovirus kuhlii, Kuhl's pipistrelle adenovirus MAG44
- Mastadenovirus lamiae, Lemur adenovirus
- Mastadenovirus longumcaudae, Simian adenovirus 49
- Mastadenovirus macacae, Simian adenovirus 13
- Mastadenovirus magnauris, Bat adenovirus 11
- Mastadenovirus marmotae, Marmot adenovirus 1
- Mastadenovirus mastomysis, Murine adenovirus 4
- Mastadenovirus miniopteridae, Bat adenovirus 7
- Mastadenovirus muris, Murine adenovirus 2
- Mastadenovirus musauriti, Bat adenovirus 3
- Mastadenovirus noctulae, Common noctule adenovirus Quixote
- Mastadenovirus otariidae, California sea lion adenovirus 1
- Mastadenovirus ovisoctavum, Ovine adenovirus 8
- Mastadenovirus ovisprimum, Ovine adenovirus 1
- Mastadenovirus phocoenae, Harbour porpoise adenovirus 1
- Mastadenovirus pipistrelli, Bat adenovirus 2
- Mastadenovirus pollicis, Simian adenovirus 58 (Black-and-white colobus adenovirus 4)
- Mastadenovirus porcusquartum, Porcine adenovirus 4
- Mastadenovirus porcusquintum, Porcine adenovirus 5
- Mastadenovirus porcustertium, Porcine adenovirus 3
- Mastadenovirus portugalense, Bat adenovirus F45
- Mastadenovirus pteropodidae, Bat adenovirus 9
- Mastadenovirus rattasiense, Tanezumi rat adenovirus 1 (Yunan rodent adenovirus 1)
- Mastadenovirus rhesi, Simian adenovirus 54
- Mastadenovirus rhinolophidae, Bat adenovirus 4
- Mastadenovirus russelli, Simian adenovirus 1
- Mastadenovirus sanguineicordis, Simian adenovirus 64
- Mastadenovirus sciuri, Red squirrel adenovirus 1
- Mastadenovirus simiae, Simian adenovirus 3
- Mastadenovirus simiavigesimum, Simian adenovirus 20
- Mastadenovirus simuli, Titi monkey adenovirus 1
- Mastadenovirus tarandri, Reindeer adenovirus 1
- Mastadenovirus trianonense, Skunk adenovirus 1
- Mastadenovirus tupaiae, Tree shrew adenovirus 1
- Mastadenovirus ursi, Polar bear adenovirus 1
- Mastadenovirus vespertilionis, Bat adenovirus 33390
