= Hexon protein =

Adeno_hexon
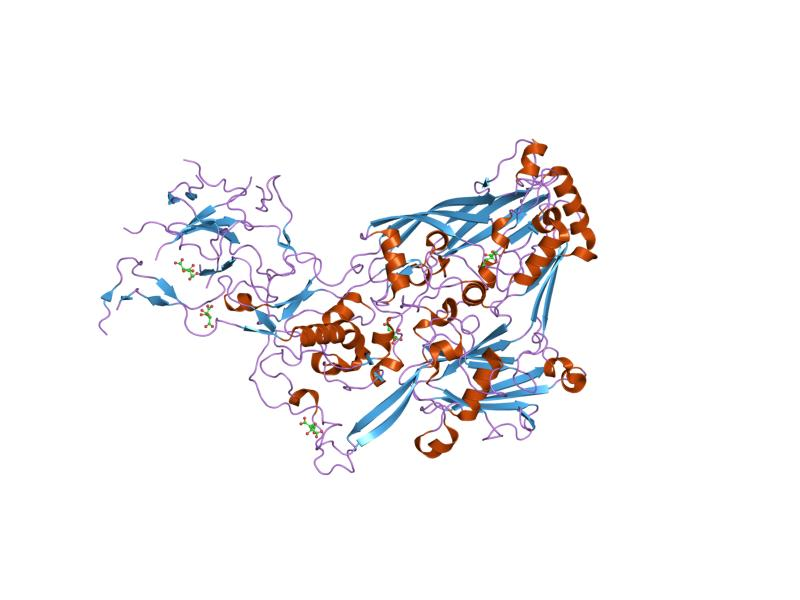
- refinement of adenovirus type 2 hexon with cns

Identifiers
- Symbol: Adeno_hexon
- Pfam: PF01065
- InterPro: IPR016107
- SCOP2: 1dhx / SCOPe / SUPFAM
Available protein structures:
- PDB: IPR016107 PF01065 (ECOD; PDBsum)
- AlphaFold: IPR016107; PF01065

Adeno_hexon_C
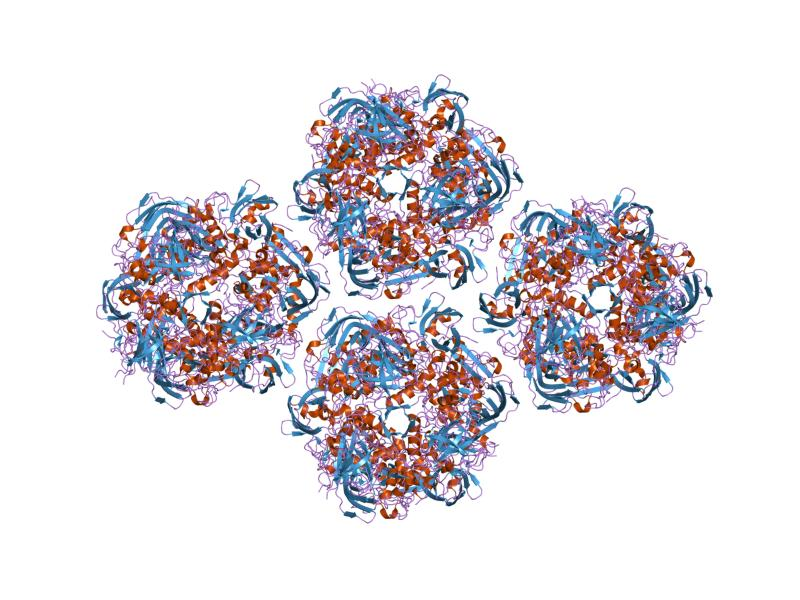
- the quasi-atomic model of human adenovirus type 5 capsid (part 2)

Identifiers
- Symbol: Adeno_hexon_C
- Pfam: PF03678
- InterPro: IPR016108
- SCOP2: 1dhx / SCOPe / SUPFAM
Available protein structures:
- PDB: IPR016108 PF03678 (ECOD; PDBsum)
- AlphaFold: IPR016108; PF03678

In molecular biology, the hexon protein is a major coat protein found in adenoviruses. Hexon coat proteins are synthesised during late infection and form homo-trimers. The 240 copies of the hexon trimer that are produced are organised so that 12 lie on each of the 20 facets. The central 9 hexons in a facet are cemented together by 12 copies of polypeptide IX. The penton complex, formed by the peripentonal hexons and penton base (holding in place a fibre), lies at each of the 12 vertices. The hexon coat protein is a duplication consisting of two domains with a similar fold packed together like the nucleoplasmin subunits. Within a hexon trimer, the domains are arranged around a pseudo 6-fold axis. The domains have a beta-sandwich structure consisting of 8 strands in two sheets with a jelly-roll topology; each domain is heavily decorated with many insertions. Some hexon proteins contain a distinct C-terminal domain.

Hexon directly recruits the cellular motor protein dynein in a pH-dependent manner. The dynein-regulatory protein, dynactin, was found to play a clear role in regulating the dynein-adenovirus complex transport to the nucleus.
