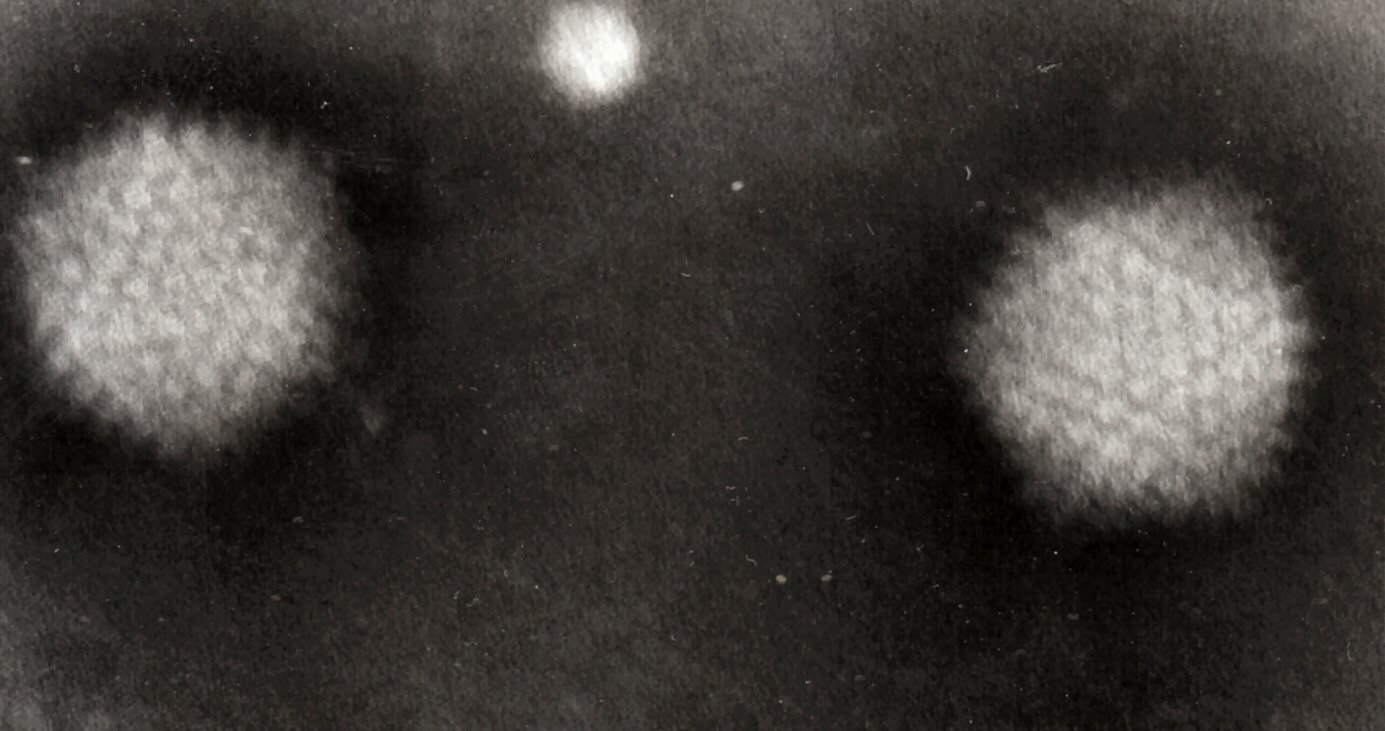
- Transmission electron micrograph of two adenovirus particles

Virus classification
- (unranked): Virus
- Realm: Varidnaviria
- Kingdom: Bamfordvirae
- Phylum: Preplasmiviricota
- Class: Pharingeaviricetes
- Order: Rowavirales
- Family: Adenoviridae

Genera
- Aviadenovirus; Barthadenovirus; Ichtadenovirus; Mastadenovirus; Siadenovirus; Testadenovirus

= Adenoviridae =

Adenoviruses

Family of viruses

Adenovirus D26 structural model at atomic resolution

Adenoviruses (members of the family Adenoviridae) are medium-sized (90–100 nm), nonenveloped (without an outer lipid bilayer) viruses with an icosahedral nucleocapsid containing a double-stranded DNA genome. Their name derives from their initial isolation from human adenoids in 1953.

They have a broad range of vertebrate hosts; in humans, more than 50 distinct adenoviral serotypes have been found to cause a wide range of illnesses, from mild respiratory infections in young children (the common cold) to life-threatening multi-organ disease in people with a weakened immune system.

== Virology ==
=== Classification ===
This family contains the following genera:

- Aviadenovirus
- Barthadenovirus
- Ichtadenovirus
- Mastadenovirus (including all human adenoviruses)
- Siadenovirus
- Testadenovirus

=== Diversity ===
In humans, currently there are 88 human adenoviruses (HAdVs) in seven species (Human adenovirus A to G):

- A: 12, 18, 31
- B: 3, 7, 11, 14, 16, 21, 34, 35, 50, 55
- C: 1, 2, 5, 6, 57
- D: 8, 9, 10, 13, 15, 17, 19, 20, 22, 23, 24, 25, 26, 27, 28, 29, 30, 32, 33, 36, 37, 38, 39, 42, 43, 44, 45, 46, 47, 48, 49, 51, 53, 54, 56, 58, 59, 60, 62, 63, 64, 65, 67, 69, 70, 71, 72, 73, 74, 75
- E: 4
- F: 40, 41
- G: 52

Different types/serotypes are associated with different conditions:

- respiratory disease (mainly species HAdV-B and C)
- conjunctivitis (HAdV-B and D)
- gastroenteritis (HAdV-F types 40, 41, HAdV-G type 52)
- obesity or adipogenesis (HAdV-A type 31, HAdV-C type 5, HAdV-D types 9, 36, 37)

All these types are called Human mastadenovirus A–G by the ICTV, because all are members of the genus Mastadenovirus.

=== Structure ===
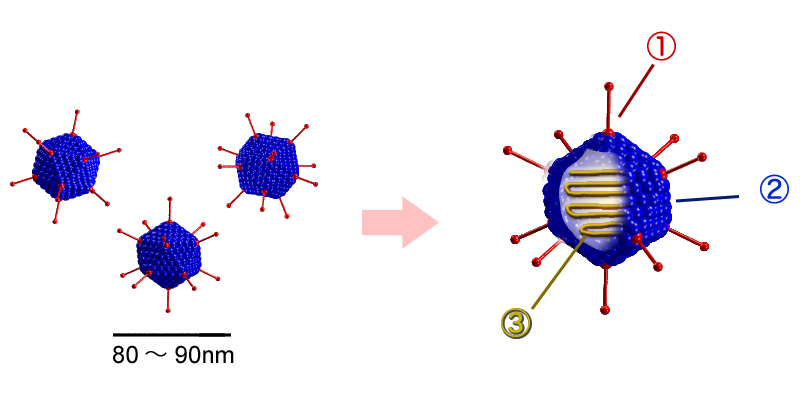
The structure of adenovirus. 1 = penton capsomers, 2 = hexon capsomers, and 3= viral genome (linear dsDNA)

Adenoviruses are medium-sized (90–100 nm). The virions are composed of one linear piece of double-stranded DNA inside an icosahedral capsid. 240 hexon proteins make up the bulk of the capsid, while twelve penton bases cap the icosahedron's corners. The penton bases are associated with protruding fibers that aid in attachment to the host cell via the receptor on its surface.

In 2010, the structure of the human adenovirus was solved at the atomic level, making it the largest high-resolution model ever. The virus is composed of around 1 million amino acid residues and weighs around 150 MDa.

=== Genome ===
Schematic diagram of the linear adenovirus genome, showing Early genes (E) and Late genes (L).

The adenovirus genome is linear, non-segmented double-stranded (ds) DNA that is between 26 and 48 kbp. This allows the virus to theoretically carry 22 to 40 genes. Although this is significantly larger than other viruses in its Baltimore group, it is still a very simple virus and is heavily reliant on the host cell for survival and replication. The genes of adenoviruses can generally be divided into well-conserved sets of transcription units with six early transcription units (E1A, E1B, E2A, E2B, E3 and E4) and one late transcription unit ranging from L1-L5. In addition, adenoviruses also contain two intermediate transcription units named XI and IVa2. To increase the viral gene economy, adenoviruses accommodate genes on both strands of its dsDNA meaning that most of its genome is utilized for coding proteins. An interesting feature of this viral genome is that it has a terminal 55 kDa protein associated with each of the 5' ends of the linear dsDNA. These are used as primers in viral replication and ensure that the ends of the virus' linear genome are adequately replicated.

=== Replication ===
Adenoviruses possess a linear dsDNA genome and are able to replicate in the nucleus of vertebrate cells using the host's replication machinery. Entry of adenoviruses into the host cell involves two sets of interactions between the virus and the host cell. Most of the action occurs at the vertices. Entry into the host cell is initiated by the knob domain of the fiber protein binding to the cell receptor. The two currently established receptors are: CD46 for the group B human adenovirus serotypes and the coxsackievirus/adenovirus receptor (CAR) for all other serotypes. There are some reports suggesting MHC molecules and sialic acid residues functioning in this capacity as well. This is followed by a secondary interaction, where a motif in the penton base protein (see capsomere) interacts with an integrin molecule. It is the co-receptor interaction that stimulates entry of the adenovirus. This co-receptor molecule is αV integrin. Binding to αV integrin results in endocytosis of the virus particle via clathrin-coated pits. Attachment to αV integrin stimulates cell signaling and thus induces actin polymerization, which facilitates clathrin-mediated endocytosis, and results in virion's entry into the host cell within an endosome.

Once the virus has successfully gained entry into the host cell, the endosome acidifies, which alters virus topology by causing capsid components to disband. The capsid is destabilized and protein VI, which is one of the capsid constituents (see Adenovirus genome) is released from it. Protein VI contains an N-terminal amphiphatic alpha-helix, a helical domain that exhibits both hydrophobic and hydrophilic properties. This amphipathic helix enables the binding of protein VI to the endosomal membrane leading to a severe membrane curvature that ultimately disrupts the endosome. These changes, as well as the toxic nature of the pentons, destroy the endosome, resulting in the movement of the virion into the cytoplasm. With the help of cellular microtubules, the virus is transported to the nuclear pore complex, whereby the adenovirus particle disassembles. Viral DNA is subsequently released, which can enter the nucleus via the nuclear pore. After this the DNA associates with histone molecules already present in the nucleus, which allows it to interact with the host cell transcription machinery. Then, viral gene expression can occur, without integrating the viral genome into host cell chromosomes, and new virus particles can be generated.

The adenovirus life cycle is separated by the DNA replication process into two phases: an early and a late phase. In both phases, a primary transcript that is alternatively spliced to generate monocistronic mRNAs compatible with the host's ribosome is generated, allowing for the products to be translated.

The early genes are responsible for expressing mainly non-structural, regulatory proteins. The goal of these proteins is threefold: to alter the expression of host proteins that are necessary for DNA synthesis; to activate other virus genes (such as the virus-encoded DNA polymerase); and to avoid premature death of the infected cell by the host-immune defenses (blockage of apoptosis, blockage of interferon activity, and blockage of MHC class I translocation and expression).

Some adenoviruses under specialized conditions can transform cells using their early gene products. E1A (binds Retinoblastoma tumor suppressor protein) has been found to immortalize primary cells in vitro allowing E1B (binds p53 tumor suppressor) to assist and stably transform the cells. Nevertheless, they are reliant upon each other to successfully transform the host cell and form tumors. E1A is mostly intrinsically disordered protein and contains CR3 domain which is critical for transcriptional activation.

DNA replication separates the early and late phases. Once the early genes have liberated adequate virus proteins, replication machinery, and replication substrates, replication of the adenovirus genome can occur. A terminal protein that is covalently bound to the 5' end of the adenovirus genome acts as a primer for replication. The viral DNA polymerase then uses a strand displacement mechanism, as opposed to the conventional Okazaki fragments used in mammalian DNA replication, to replicate the genome.

The late phase of the adenovirus lifecycle is focused on producing sufficient quantities of structural protein to pack all the genetic material produced by DNA replication. Once the viral components have successfully been replicated, the virus is assembled into its protein shells and released from the cell as a result of virally induced cell lysis.

=== Multiplicity reactivation ===
Adenovirus is capable of multiplicity reactivation (MR) (Yamamoto and Shimojo, 1971). MR is the process by which two, or more, virus genomes that have been damaged to the point of nonviability interact within the infected cell to form a viable virus genome. Such MR was demonstrated for adenovirus 12 after virions were irradiated with UV light and allowed to undergo multiple infection of host cells. In a review, numerous examples of MR in different viruses were described, and it was suggested that MR is a common form of sexual interaction that provides the survival advantage of recombinational repair of genome damages.

== Epidemiology ==
=== Transmission ===
Adenoviruses are unusually stable to chemical or physical agents and adverse pH conditions, allowing for prolonged survival outside of the body and water. Adenoviruses are spread primarily via respiratory droplets, however they can also be spread by fecal routes and via aerosols (airborne transmission). Research into the molecular mechanisms underlying adenoviral transmission provide empirical evidence in support of the hypothesis that coxsackievirus/adenovirus receptors (CARs) are needed to transport adenoviruses into certain naive/progenitor cell types.

=== Humans ===
Humans infected with adenoviruses display a wide range of responses, from no symptoms at all to the severe infections typical of Adenovirus serotype 14.

=== Animals ===
Bat adenovirus TJM (Bt-AdV-TJM) is a novel species of the Mastadenovirus genus isolated from Myotis and Scotophilus kuhlii in China. It is most closely related to the tree shrew and canine AdVs.

Two types of canine adenoviruses are well known, type 1 and 2. Type 1 (CAdV-1) causes infectious canine hepatitis, a potentially fatal disease involving vasculitis and hepatitis. Type 1 infection can also cause respiratory and eye infections. CAdV-1 also affects foxes (Vulpes vulpes and Vulpes lagopus) and may cause hepatitis and encephalitis. Canine adenovirus 2 (CAdV-2) is one of the potential causes of kennel cough. Core vaccines for dogs include attenuated live CAdV-2, which produces immunity to CAdV-1 and CAdV-2. CAdV-1 was initially used in a vaccine for dogs, but corneal edema was a common complication.

Squirrel adenovirus (SqAdV) is reported to cause enteritis in red squirrels in Europe, while gray squirrels seem to be resistant. SqAdV is most closely related to the adenovirus of guinea pigs (GpAdV).

Adenovirus in reptiles is poorly understood, but research is currently in progress.

Adenoviruses are also known to cause respiratory infections in horses, cattle, pigs, sheep, and goats. Equine adenovirus 1 can also cause fatal disease in immunocompromised Arabian foals, involving pneumonia and destruction of pancreatic and salivary gland tissue. Tupaia adenovirus (TAV) (tree shrew adenovirus 1) has been isolated from tree shrews.

Otarine adenovirus 1 has been isolated from sea lions (Zalophus californianus).

The fowl adenoviruses are associated with many disease conditions in domestic fowl like inclusion body hepatitis, hydropericardium syndrome, egg drop syndrome, quail bronchitis, and gizzard erosions. They have also been isolated from wild black kites (Milvus migrans).

Titi monkey adenovirus was isolated from a colony of monkeys.

== Prevention ==
Currently there is a vaccine for adenovirus type 4 and 7 for US military personnel only. US military personnel are the recipients of this vaccine because they may be at a higher risk of infection. The vaccine contains a live virus, which may be shed in stool and lead to transmission. The vaccine is not approved for use outside of the military, as it has not been tested in studied in the general population or on people with weakened immune systems.

In the past, US military recruits were vaccinated against two serotypes of adenovirus, with a corresponding decrease in illnesses caused by those serotypes. That vaccine is no longer manufactured. The U.S. Army Medical Research and Materiel Command announced on 31 October 2011 that a new adenovirus vaccine, which replaces the older version that has been out of production for over a decade, was shipped to basic training sites on 18 October 2011.

Prevention of adenovirus, as well as other respiratory illnesses, involves frequent hand washing for more than 20 seconds, avoiding touching the eyes, face, and nose with unwashed hands, and avoiding close contact with people with symptomatic adenovirus infection. Those with symptomatic adenovirus infection are additionally advised to cough or sneeze into the arm or elbow instead of the hand, to avoid sharing cups and eating utensils, and to refrain from kissing others. Chlorination of swimming pools can prevent outbreaks of conjunctivitis caused by adenovirus.

== Diagnosis ==
Diagnosis is from symptoms and history. Tests are only necessary in very serious cases. Tests include blood tests, eyes, nose or throat swabs, stool sample tests, and chest x-rays. In the laboratory, adenovirus can be identified with antigen detection, polymerase chain reaction (PCR), virus isolation and serology. Even if adenovirus is found to be present, it may not be the cause of any symptoms. Some immunocompromised individuals can shed the virus for weeks and show no symptoms.

== Infections ==
Most infections with adenovirus result in infections of the upper respiratory tract. Adenovirus infections often present as conjunctivitis, tonsillitis (which may look exactly like strep throat and cannot be distinguished from strep except by throat culture), an ear infection, or croup. Adenoviruses types 40 and 41 can also cause gastroenteritis. A combination of conjunctivitis and tonsillitis is particularly common with adenovirus infections.

Some children (especially the youngest) can develop adenovirus bronchiolitis or pneumonia, both of which can be severe. In babies, adenoviruses can also cause coughing fits that look almost exactly like whooping cough. Adenoviruses can also cause viral meningitis or encephalitis. Rarely, adenovirus can cause hemorrhagic cystitis (inflammation of the urinary bladder—a form of urinary tract infection—with blood in the urine).

Most people recover from adenovirus infections by themselves, but people with immunodeficiency sometimes die of adenovirus infections, and—rarely—even previously healthy people can die of these infections. This may be because sometimes adenoviral infection can lead to cardiac disorders. For example, in one study, some cardiac samples of patients with dilated cardiomyopathy were positive for presence of adenovirus type 8.

Adenoviruses are often transmitted by expectoration (e.g. aerosols), but they can also be transmitted by contact with an infected person, or by virus particles left on objects such as towels and faucet handles. Some people with adenovirus gastroenteritis may shed the virus in their stools for months after getting over the symptoms. The virus can be passed through water in swimming pools that are not sufficiently chlorinated.

As with many other illnesses, good handwashing practice is one way to inhibit the person-to-person transmission of adenoviruses. Heat and bleach will kill adenoviruses on objects.

== Treatment ==
There are no proven antiviral drugs to treat adenoviral infections, so treatment is largely directed at the symptoms (such as acetaminophen for fever). The antiviral drug cidofovir has helped certain of those patients who had severe cases of illness; the number helped and to what degree, and the particular complications or symptoms it helped with, and when and where this happened, were not given in the source. A doctor may give antibiotic eyedrops for conjunctivitis, while awaiting results of bacterial cultures, and to help prevent secondary bacterial infections. Currently, there is no adenovirus vaccine available to the general public, but a vaccine is available for the United States military for Types 4 and 7.

== Use in gene therapy and vaccination ==
=== Gene therapy ===
Adenoviruses have long been a popular viral vector for gene therapy due to their ability to affect both replicating and non-replicating cells, accommodate large transgenes, and code for proteins without integrating genetic material into the host cell genome. More specifically, they are used as a vehicle to administer targeted therapy, in the form of recombinant DNA or protein. This therapy has been found especially useful in treating monogenic disease (e.g. cystic fibrosis, X-linked SCID, alpha1-antitrypsin deficiency) and cancer. In China, oncolytic adenovirus is an approved cancer treatment. Other oncolytic viruses are also under development, aimed at a range of additional solid tumor types. Specific modifications on fiber proteins are used to target Adenovirus to certain cell types; a major effort is made to limit hepatotoxicity and prevent multiple organ failure. Adenovirus dodecahedron can qualify as a potent delivery platform for foreign antigens to human myeloid dendritic cells (MDC), and that it is efficiently presented by MDC to M1-specific CD8+ T lymphocytes.

A safety issue with adenoviruses is that they can cause an immune response with a related inflammatory response as occurred in the death of Jesse Gelsinger in 1999. To address this risk, the genome of the virus has been modified to remove some viral genes. One such modification is the gutless vector that removes almost all the viral genome.

Adenovirus has been used for delivery of CRISPR/Cas9 gene editing systems, but high immune reactivity to viral infection has posed challenges in use for patients.

=== Vaccines ===
Modified (recombinant) adenovirus vectors, including replication incompetent types, can deliver DNA coding for specific antigens.

Adenovirus have been used to produce viral vector COVID-19 vaccines. "In four candidate COVID-19 vaccines... Ad5... serves as the 'vector' to transport the surface protein gene of SARS-CoV-2". The goal is to genetically express the spike glycoprotein of severe acute respiratory syndrome coronavirus 2 (SARS-CoV-2). A replication-deficient chimpanzee adenovirus vaccine vector (ChAdOx1) is used by the Oxford–AstraZeneca COVID-19 vaccine that has been approved for use. The Janssen COVID-19 vaccine uses modified recombinant adenovirus type-26 (Ad26). Recombinant adenovirus type-5 (Ad5) are being used by Ad5-nCoV, ImmunityBio and UQ-CSL V451. The Gam-COVID-Vac (aka Sputnik-V) product is innovative because an Ad26 based vaccine is used on the first day and an Ad5 vaccine is used on day 21. Another one is ChAd-SARS-CoV-2-S; the vaccine reportedly prevented mice that were genetically modified to have human ACE2 (hACE2) receptors, presumably receptors that allow virus-entry into the cells, from being infected with SARS-CoV-2.

Possible issues with using Adenovirus as vaccine vectors include: the human body develops immunity to the vector itself, making subsequent booster shots difficult or impossible. In some cases, people have pre-existing immunity to Adenoviruses, making vector delivery ineffective.

==== HIV infection concerns ====
The use of Ad5 vaccines for COVID-19 worried researchers who had experience with two failed trials of an Ad5 vaccine, Phambili and STEP, due to the increased risk for uncircumcised male patients of contracting HIV-1 via unprotected anal sex. At the time, it was concluded that heightened risk of HIV reception may be observed for any Ad5-based vector vaccine. In October 2020, these researchers wrote in The Lancet: "On the basis of these findings, we are concerned that use of an Ad5 vector for immunisation against SARS-CoV-2 could similarly increase the risk of HIV-1 acquisition among men who receive the vaccine." Vaccines using other technologies would not be affected, but Sputnik V, Convidecia and ImmunityBio's hAd5 would. Two studies found that Ad5-specific CD4 T cells are more susceptible to HIV infection than CD4 T cells specific to certain other vectors, such as Cytomegalovirus and Canarypox.

By comparison, a Science article reported that China had approved CanSino's Ebola vaccine based on an Ad5 vector. It was tested in Sierra Leone, which had high HIV prevalence, making it more likely for such problems to be detected. CanSino's CEO said "we haven't seen anything with the Ebola vaccine" and speculated that HIV susceptibility might be limited to Ad5 vaccines which produced HIV proteins. In research reported in The Lancet in May, the company's researchers acknowledged the possibility, called it "controversial" and said they would watch for it in the company's COVID-19 vaccine candidate's trials. It is not known to what extent LGBT discrimination in Sierra Leone could have contributed to masking a possible causal link in the Ebola vaccine trial; while the Step trial enrolled mainly homosexual and bisexual men, the Phambili trial enrolled mainly heterosexual men and women and still found an apparent connection.

== See also ==
- VA (viral associated) RNA
