= Preplasmiviricota =

Virus classification
- (unranked): Virus
- Realm: Varidnaviria
- Kingdom: Bamfordvirae
- Phylum: Preplasmiviricota

Subtaxa
- See text

Phylum of viruses

Preplasmiviricota is a phylum of viruses. Its name means "precursor of certain plasmids".

== Taxonomy ==
The phylum contains two subphyla that contain five classes. Subphyla are suffixed with -viricotina, and classes are suffixed with -viricetes. This taxonomy is shown hereafter.

- Subphylum: Polisuviricotina
  - Aquintoviricetes, the Polinton-like viruses (PLVs)
  - Pharingeaviricetes, which includes the adenoviruses
  - Polintoviricetes, the Polintons themselves (despite virions not being known to exist)
  - Virophaviricetes, the virophages
- Subphylum: Prepoliviricotina
  - Tectiliviricetes
