= Equine herpesvirus =

Equine herpesvirus is a group of viruses of the family Herpesviridae that infect horses.

- Equine herpesvirus 1 of the subfamily Alphaherpesvirinae and genus Varicellovirus
- Equine herpesvirus 2 of the subfamily Gammaherpesvirinae and genus Rhadinovirus
- Equine herpesvirus 3 of the subfamily Alphaherpesvirinae and genus Varicellovirus
- Equine herpesvirus 4 of the subfamily Alphaherpesvirinae and genus Varicellovirus
- Equine herpesvirus 5 of the subfamily Gammaherpesvirinae and genus Rhadinovirus
- Equine herpesvirus 6 of the subfamily Alphaherpesvirinae and genus Varicellovirus
- Equine herpesvirus 7 of the subfamily Gammaherpesvirinae and genus Not assigned
- Equine herpesvirus 8 of the subfamily Alphaherpesvirinae and genus Varicellovirus
- Equine herpesvirus 9 of the subfamily Alphaherpesvirinae and genus Varicellovirus
