= Equine venereal disease =

Sexually transmitted diseases of horses

Equine venereal diseases are sexually transmitted infections in horses. They include contagious equine metritis (CEM) (caused by Taylorella equigenitalis) and equine coital exanthema (caused by equine herpesvirus 3).

== Equine coital exanthema ==
This disease affects the external genitalia, and is caused by equine herpesvirus 3. This disease remains with the horse for all its life. Equine coital exanthema is believed to only be transmitted during the acute phase of the disease through serous fluid from the blisters during sexual intercourse, and via breeding tools, handlers, etc.

Clinical signs include cute small lesions, no bigger than 2 mm in diameter around the vulva in mares, and on the sheath in stallions. The small bumps blister and then rupture, leaving raw, ulcerated, painful sores. While the majority of the symptoms are external, the presence of the virus can cause small and large plaque variants in tissues.

== Contagious equine metritis ==
The acute symptoms of contagious equine metritis include acyine inflammation of the uterus, an obvious thick, milky, mucous vulvar discharge 10 to 14 days after a live covering by a stallion. Chronic symptoms include milder uterine inflammation that will cause less obvious vulvar discharge, and then the infection may be more difficult to eliminate. Carrier mares can occur once the bacteria become stable within the reproductive tract. These mares can be asymptomatic for months and still remain infectious.

The first case of CEM was diagnosed in England in 1977. It has infected horses in 26 countries: Austria, Belgium, Bosnia-Herzegovina, Croatia, the Czech Republic, Denmark, Finland, France, Germany, Great Britain, Greece, Guinea-Bissau, Ireland, Italy, Japan, Luxembourg, the Republic of Macedonia, Montenegro, the Netherlands, Norway, Serbia, the Slovak Republic, Slovenia, Sweden, Switzerland, and the United States.
