= Taylorella =

Scientific classification
- Domain: Bacteria
- Kingdom: Pseudomonadati
- Phylum: Pseudomonadota
- Class: Betaproteobacteria
- Order: Burkholderiales
- Family: Alcaligenaceae
- Genus: Taylorella

Species
- T. equigenitalis T. asinigenitalis

Genus of bacteria

Taylorella is a genus comprising Gram-negative, short rod-shaped, chemoorganotrophic bacteria that include species that are the causative agents of contagious equine metritis. The name Taylorella serves as a dedication to C.E.D. Taylor, the scientist who identified the only species originally included in this genus. They are non-motile microaerophiles that are able to be isolated in pure culture on chocolate agar. .

== Phylogeny ==
The genus Taylorella was first identified by C.E.D Taylor in 1978. It was formerly classified under the genus Haemophilus, and there was originally considerable debate on whether it is more closely related to Moraxella. Due to further investigation by DNA: DNA hybridization and genomic characteristics of this genus, Sugimoto et al. 1983 proposed the creation of a new genus that would include two species isolated from the family Equidae. The species include:

- Taylorella equigenitalis: causes contagious equine metritis in horses.
- Taylorella asinigenitalis: found in the genital tract of donkeys, this species is not pathogenic.

== Physiology ==
As a genus, Taylorella spp. lack glycolysis and the hexose monophosphate pathways, but conserve energy from the oxidation of organic molecules via the citric acid cycle (TCA) and oxidative phosphorylation. Taylorella species are predicted to have a complete TCA cycle, however, three key genes or pathways allowing for the conversion of glucose into pyruvate are absent. These include the 6-phosphofructokinase gene, the non-oxidative branch and transaldolase in the pentose phosphate pathway, and the Entner-Doudoroff pathway. Studies show that the organic acids, malate, glutamate, and alpha-ketoglutarate serve as the main carbon sources for Taylorella spp. While both malate and glutamate are TCA cycle intermediates, alpha-ketoglutarate is a product of deamination of glutamate by glutamate dehydrogenase. Furthermore, genes encoding NADH dehydrogenase, succinate dehydrogenase, cytochrome c reductase, ATP synthase, and a terminal oxidase are found in Taylorella species. This oxidase belongs to the cbb3-type cytochrome c oxidase type, which plays a role in microaerobic respiration. It has been speculated that expression of this oxidase is a requirement for colonization of suboxic tissues. Additionally, respiration is stimulated by Kreb's cycle intermediates. Taylorella is unable to ferment carbohydrates. In some experiments, Taylorella was inhibited by the presence of fermentable carbohydrates.

== Ecology ==
The genus Taylorella harbors two species associated with sexually transmitted diseases in horses and donkeys. Taylorella has an optimum growth between 35 and 37 degrees Celsius but is able to grow between 30 and 42 degrees Celsius. The genus Taylorella was first reported in horses as Taylorella equigenitalis in the United Kingdom in 1977. Now, Taylorella is found on 5 of the 7 continents. Due to the prevalence of this genus and its association with CEM, serological and bacteriological screenings are now used to ensure that Equividae does not have CEM before coming into the United States. The largest contributing factor to the worldwide spread of CEM is carriers for Taylorella. Taylorella species can persist in the genitalia of the equine for years where it can still be transmitted to other equines through sexual or artificial insemination. While mares can be asymptomatic, when symptomatic these mares have a low fertility rate and if they become pregnant the likelihood of a miscarriage is high. In some cases, there is also a vertical transmission of CEM from the mare to the fetus through the placenta. This continues the cycle of infection to future mares. This becomes a clinical concern to equine breeding and an economical concern due to infertility. To help prevent infection, good hygiene and use of sterile or disposable equipment when inseminating mare or collecting semen from colts. Furthermore, Taylorella species do not survive long out of the context of reproductive tissues. Taylorella species are also sensitive to high temperatures, humidity, disinfectants, and UV light.

== Special Features ==
One special feature of Taylorella is the fastidious growth conditions. Taylorella growth is dependent on both enriched bacteriological media and microaerophilic incubation conditions. There is no observed growth on ordinary nutrient media under normal growth conditions and very poor growth is observed on blood agar. The organism grows best on chocolate agar.

== Biochemical Test Results ==
| name = Biochemical Tests. | Oxidase = positive | Catalase = positive | Indole = negative | H2S test = negative | Urease = negative | Motility =non-motile | Nitrate =negative | Gram-stain =negative | Gelatin Hydrolysis =negative | Relationship to Oxygen =microaerophile | Cell shape = coccobacillus
