= Phocid herpesvirus 1 =

Virus classification
- (unranked): Virus
- Realm: Duplodnaviria
- Kingdom: Heunggongvirae
- Phylum: Peploviricota
- Class: Herviviricetes
- Order: Herpesvirales
- Family: Orthoherpesviridae
- Genus: Varicellovirus
- Species: Varicellovirus phocidalpha1

Synonyms
- Phocid alphaherpesvirus 1; Phocid herpesvirus 1

Species of virus

Phocid herpesvirus 1 (PhHV-1) is a species of virus in the genus Varicellovirus, subfamily Alphaherpesvirinae, family Orthoherpesviridae, and order Herpesvirales.
