= SVV =

SVV may refer to:

- Schiedamse Voetbal Vereniging
- Schweizerischer Vaterländischer Verband
- Simian varicella virus
- Shri Vinayaka Vijayamu, a 1979 Telugu film directed by K. Kameshwara Rao
- abbr. for "si vales valeo" (= if you are well, I am well)
- abbr. for "sit venia verbo" (= if you will pardon the expression)
- Sodalitas Vulturis Volantis
