= Bubaline herpesvirus 1 =

Virus classification
- (unranked): Virus
- Realm: Duplodnaviria
- Kingdom: Heunggongvirae
- Phylum: Peploviricota
- Class: Herviviricetes
- Order: Herpesvirales
- Family: Orthoherpesviridae
- Genus: Varicellovirus
- Species: Varicellovirus bubalinealpha1

Synonyms
- Bubaline alphaherpesvirus 1; Bubaline herpesvirus 1

Species of virus

Bubaline herpesvirus 1 (BuHV-1) is a species of virus in the genus Varicellovirus, subfamily Alphaherpesvirinae, family Orthoherpesviridae, and order Herpesvirales.
