= Smegma =

Secretion of mammalian genitals

Smegma (from Ancient Greek σμῆγμα, smêgma, 'soap') is a cheesy substance composed of shed skin cells, skin oils, and moisture that occurs in male and female mammalian genitalia. In males, smegma collects under the foreskin; in females, it collects around the clitoris and in the folds of the labia minora.

== Females ==
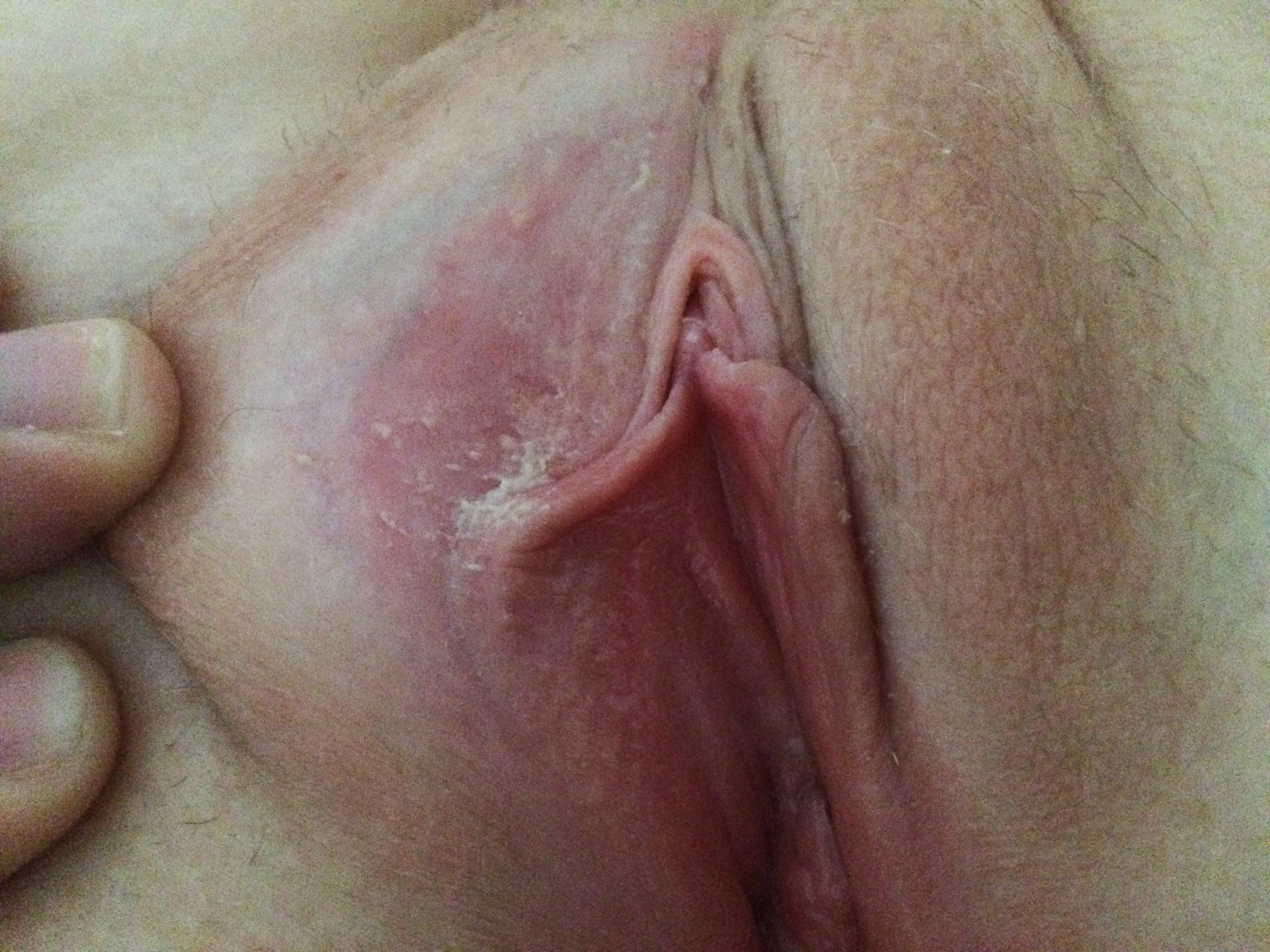
Human vulva with visible smegma between the labia

The accumulation of sebum combined with dead skin cells forms smegma. Smegma clitoridis is defined as the secretion of the apocrine (sweat) and sebaceous (sebum) glands of the clitoris in combination with desquamating epithelial cells. Glands that are located around the clitoris, the labia minora, and the labia majora secrete sebum.

If smegma is not removed frequently it can lead to clitoral adhesion which can make clitoral stimulation (such as masturbation) painful (clitorodynia).

== Males ==
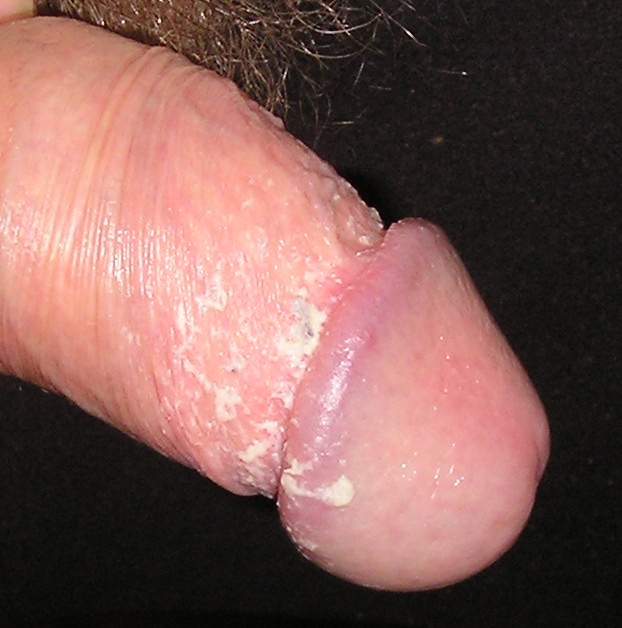
Human penis with visible smegma behind the glans

In males, smegma helps keep the glans moist and facilitates sexual intercourse by acting as a lubricant.

Smegma was originally thought to be produced by sebaceous glands near the frenulum called Tyson's glands; however, subsequent studies have failed to find these glands. Joyce Wright states that smegma is produced from minute microscopic protrusions of the mucosal surface of the foreskin and that living cells constantly grow towards the surface, undergo fatty degeneration, separate off, and form smegma. Parkash et al. found that smegma contains 26.6% fats and 13.3% proteins, which they judged to be consistent with necrotic epithelial debris.

Newly produced smegma has a smooth, moist texture. It is thought to be rich in squalene and contain prostatic and seminal secretions, desquamated epithelial cells, and the mucin content of the urethral glands of Littré. Smegma contains cathepsin B, lysozymes, chymotrypsin, neutrophil elastase and cytokines, which aid the immune system.

According to Wright, the production of smegma, which is low in childhood, increases from adolescence until sexual maturity when the function of smegma for lubrication assumes its full value. From middle-age, production starts to decline and in old age virtually no smegma is produced. Jakob Øster reported that the incidence of smegma increased from 1% among 6- to 9-year-olds to 8% among 14- to 17-year-olds (amongst those who did not present with phimosis and could be examined).

Smegma can cause irritation and inflammation in males, which can increase the risk of penile cancer.

== Other animals ==
In healthy animals, smegma helps clean and lubricate the genitals. In veterinary medicine, analysis of this smegma is sometimes used for detection of urogenital tract pathogens, such as Tritrichomonas foetus. Accumulation of smegma in the equine preputial folds and the urethral fossa and urethral diverticulum can form large "beans" and promote the carriage of Taylorella equigenitalis, the causative agent of contagious equine metritis. Some equine veterinarians have recommended periodic cleaning of male genitals to improve the health of the animal.

== See also ==
- Keratin pearl
- List of cutaneous conditions
- Mycobacterium smegmatis – found in smegma
