= Equine herpesvirus 4 =

Virus classification
- (unranked): Virus
- Realm: Duplodnaviria
- Kingdom: Heunggongvirae
- Phylum: Peploviricota
- Class: Herviviricetes
- Order: Herpesvirales
- Family: Orthoherpesviridae
- Genus: Varicellovirus
- Species: Varicellovirus equidalpha4

Synonyms
- Equid alphaherpesvirus 4; Equid herpesvirus 4; Equine herpesvirus 4

Species of virus

Equine herpesvirus 4 (EHV-4) is a virus of the family Orthoherpesviridae that causes rhinopneumonitis in horses. It is the most important viral cause of respiratory infection in foals. Like other herpes viruses, EHV-4 causes a lifelong latent infection in affected animals. These horses are usually the source for new infection for foals over two months old, weanlings, and yearlings. Symptoms include fever, loss of appetite, and discharge from the nose. Most infected animals recover in one to three weeks, but death can occur in environments with overcrowding and other stress factors. There are several vaccines available (ATCvet codes: QI05AA03 (WHO) inactivated, QI05AD01 (WHO) live, plus various combinations).

== Description ==
EHV-4 is an upper respiratory disease restricted to the infection of the respiratory tract epithelium and its associated lymph nodes. EHV-4 and its close relative EHV 1 are clinically and pathologically indistinguishable and are the primary pathogens that cause respiratory tract disease in young horses from weanling to 2 years of age. Incubation period of Equine Herpiesvirus is 2–10 days. Symptoms include fever (38.9–41.7 °C), loss of appetite, and a nasal discharge giving it the nickname "snots". Without antibiotic treatment, the damage to the respiratory mucosal barrier predisposes infected horses to secondary infections and the involvement of the lower airways (ex. bronchiolitis or pneumonia); Increasing the duration, severity and the mortality of the disease. EHV-4 rarely causes abortion in infected pregnant mares unlike its EHV-1 counterpart. Although there is no specific treatment for the disease once a horse is infected, vaccination against EHV-1 and EHV-4 is recommended as part of preventative herd health for those at high risk of infection. Multiple vaccines are available (Duvaxyn EHV1,4, EquiGuard, EquiVac EHV-1/4, etc.), most in an inactivated virus form.

The Equine Herpesvirus occupies the horse in such a way that allows post infection viral persistency over the lifetime of an animal. These carrier horses may comprise up to half of a given horse population. Therefore, management practices are recommended for controlling and managing EHV include isolating incoming horses for 3–4 weeks before co-mingling with resident horses and pregnant mares, reducing stress to prevent the reappearance of a latent virus and if there is an appearance of EHV affected horses should be isolated, and disinfection of the contaminated premise should commence. (The EHV has a large genome (150 kb) which is enclosed in a relatively fragile capsule. This limits their survival in the external environment and makes them highly susceptible to common disinfectants.) After an outbreak no horse should leave the premise for three weeks after the final clinical case recovers. Effective prevention measures, quick diagnosis, therapeutic intervention and the ability to control the spread in the case of an outbreak all allow for the management of EHV.
