= Head cheese (disambiguation) =

Head cheese may refer to:

- Head cheese, also known as brawn, a terrine usually made from the head of a pig or calf and set in aspic
- A slang term for smegma in many English speaking countries
- A short-lived professional wrestling tag team between Al Snow and Steve Blackman
- The original name for 1974's The Texas Chain Saw Massacre
