= EHV =

EHV may refer to:

- Equine herpesvirus, a group of viruses that affect horses
- Extra high voltage, a type of power supply
- Evangelical Heritage Version, an English language translation of the Bible
- Eindhoven, a city in the Netherlands
