= The Turtle Hospital =

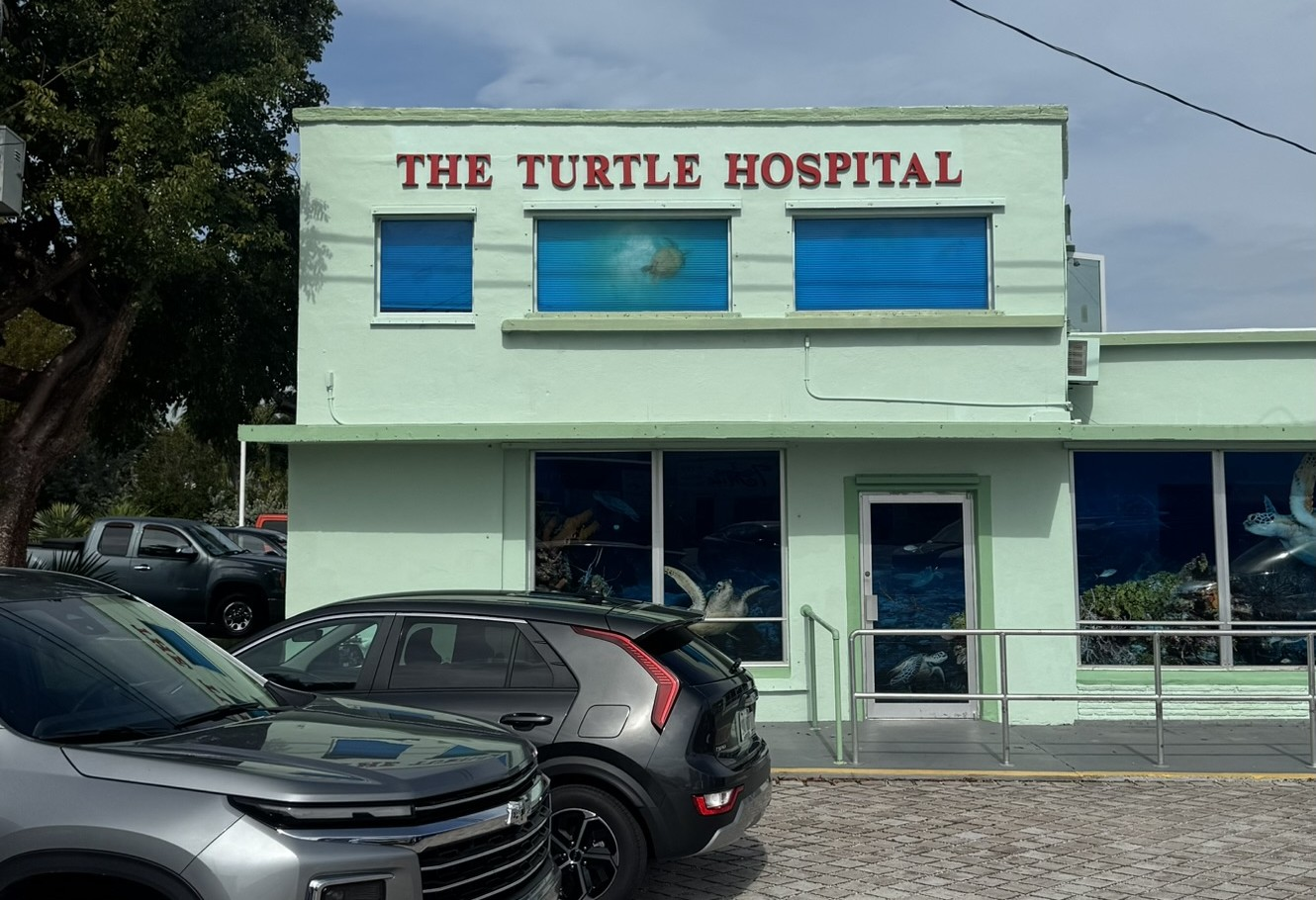
- Exterior of the main hospital building
- Interactive map of The Turtle Hospital
- 24.70973°N 81.1017°W
- Date opened: 1986
- Location: Marathon, Florida, United States
- Website: Official website

The Turtle Hospital is a veterinary hospital and rehabilitation center for sea turtles located in Marathon, Florida. It operates as a non-profit organization with the main goals of rescuing, rehabilitating, and releasing sick and injured turtles.

== History ==
Richie Moretti purchased the Hidden Harbor Motel in 1981 and repurposed its saltwater pool as an aquarium for fish. Children visiting the aquarium, influenced by the popular Teenage Mutant Ninja Turtles franchise, repeatedly asked to see a turtle. Because of their endangered status, the only way the state would permit him to keep sea turtles was as part of a rehabilitation program. This led Moretti to found The Turtle Hospital in 1986.

A former strip club building next door was acquired in 1991 and converted into the main hospital building. Lodging operations at the motel stopped in 2005.

== Operations ==
The Turtle Hospital's facilities include an operating room, an ambulance van, a 100,000 US gallons (380,000 L) tide pool, and 23 smaller tanks.

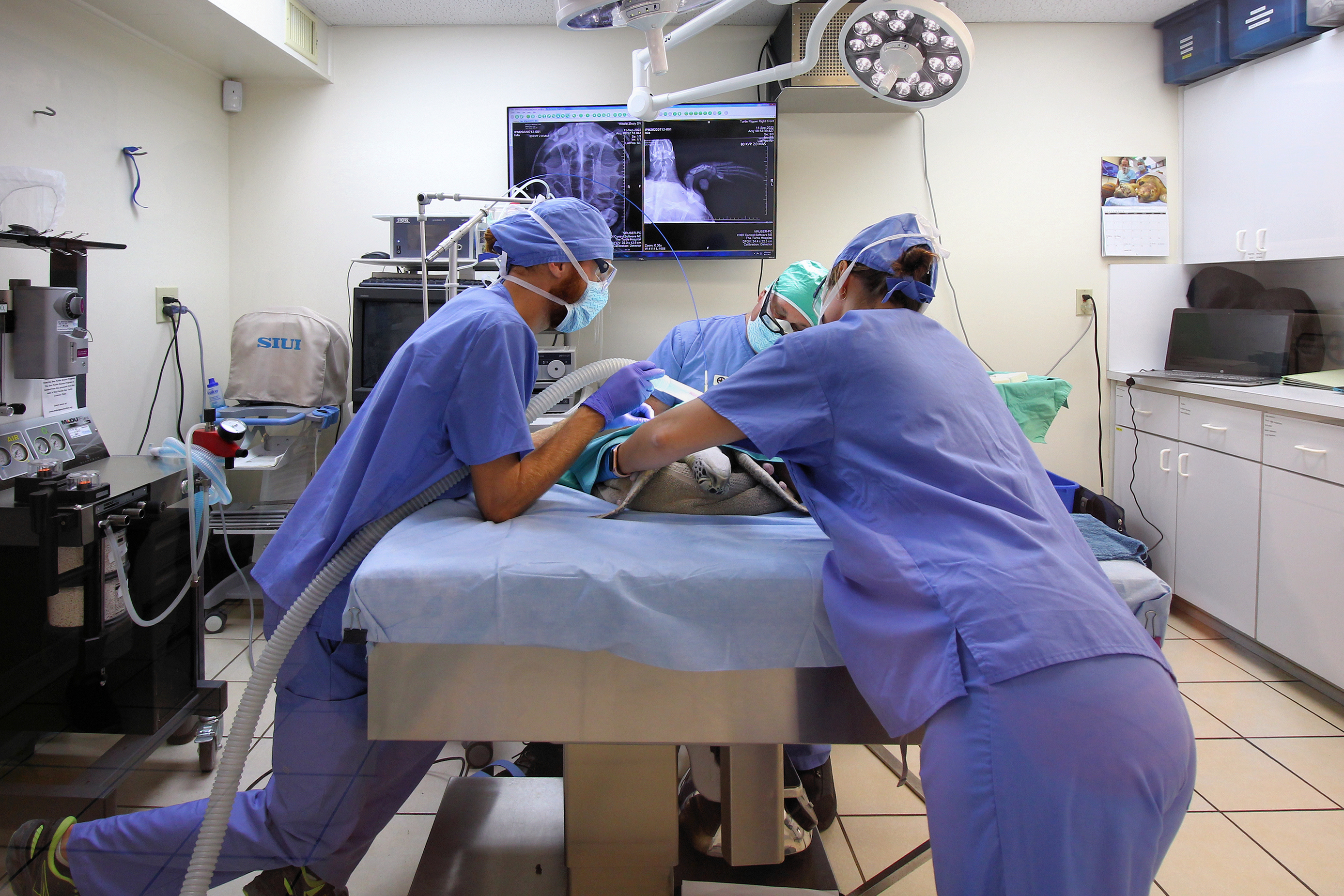
Veterinarians removing tumors from a sea turtle at The Turtle Hospital.

The hospital maintains a hotline for the local community to report animals in distress and assists with rescue efforts from other areas.

The main conditions treated are injuries from boat strikes and entanglement in plastic, as well as tumors caused by fibropapillomatosis. Since its founding, the hospital has treated over 3,000 turtles. After treatment, turtles are returned to their natural habitats or kept in pools at the hospital if their condition would render them vulnerable in the wild.

The hospital offers regular guided tours of the premises to visitors and school groups, attracting approximately 70,000 visitors annually as of 2015, and maintains a social media presence providing treatment updates.
