= Cervid herpesvirus 3 =

Virus classification
- (unranked): Virus
- Realm: Duplodnaviria
- Kingdom: Heunggongvirae
- Phylum: Peploviricota
- Class: Herviviricetes
- Order: Herpesvirales
- Family: Orthoherpesviridae
- Genus: Varicellovirus
- Species: Varicellovirus cervidalpha3

Synonyms
- Cervid alphaherpesvirus 3; Cervid herpesvirus 3

Species of virus

Cervid herpesvirus 3 (CvHV-3) is a species of virus in the genus Varicellovirus, subfamily Alphaherpesvirinae, family Orthoherpesviridae, and order Herpesvirales.
