= Caprine herpesvirus 1 =

Virus classification
- (unranked): Virus
- Realm: Duplodnaviria
- Kingdom: Heunggongvirae
- Phylum: Peploviricota
- Class: Herviviricetes
- Order: Herpesvirales
- Family: Orthoherpesviridae
- Genus: Varicellovirus
- Species: Varicellovirus caprinealpha1

Synonyms
- Caprine alphaherpesvirus 1; Caprine herpesvirus 1

Species of virus

Caprine herpesvirus 1 (CpHV-1) is a species of virus known to infect goats worldwide. It has been shown to produce systemic and respiratory symptoms in kids and to cause abortions in adult goats.

The virus is in the genus Varicellovirus, subfamily Alphaherpesvirinae, family Orthoherpesviridae, and order Herpesvirales.

It is less studied than some of the other ruminant viruses in the genus Varicellovirus including Bovine herpesvirus 1 (BoHV-1), and research conflicts about its level of species specificity and its ability to cause bovine infection and illness. Like many other members of its genus, CpHV-1 has been shown to replicate in the respiratory tract and to cause latent infections. There is not currently a vaccine.
