= Equine herpesvirus 9 =

Virus classification
- (unranked): Virus
- Realm: Duplodnaviria
- Kingdom: Heunggongvirae
- Phylum: Peploviricota
- Class: Herviviricetes
- Order: Herpesvirales
- Family: Orthoherpesviridae
- Genus: Varicellovirus
- Species: Varicellovirus equidalpha9

Synonyms
- Equid alphaherpesvirus 9; Equine alphaherpesvirus 9; Equine herpesvirus 9

Species of virus

Equine herpesvirus 9 (EHV-9) is a species of virus in the genus Varicellovirus, subfamily Alphaherpesvirinae, family Orthoherpesviridae, and order Herpesvirales. It was first isolated from a case of epizootic encephalitis in a herd of Thomson's gazelle (Gazella thomsoni) in 1993. Fatal encephalitis was reported from Thomson's gazelle, giraffe, and polar bear in natural infections. The virus was reported in an aborted Persian onager and a polar bear.
