= ATCvet code QI05 =

Veterinary medical products classification subgroup

ATCvet code QI05 Immunologicals for equidae is a therapeutic subgroup of the Anatomical Therapeutic Chemical Classification System for veterinary medicinal products, a system of alphanumeric codes developed by the World Health Organization (WHO) for the classification of drugs and other medical products for veterinary use. Subgroup QI05 is part of the anatomical group QI Immunologicals.

National versions of the ATC classification may include additional codes not present in this list, which follows the WHO version.

== QI05A Horse ==
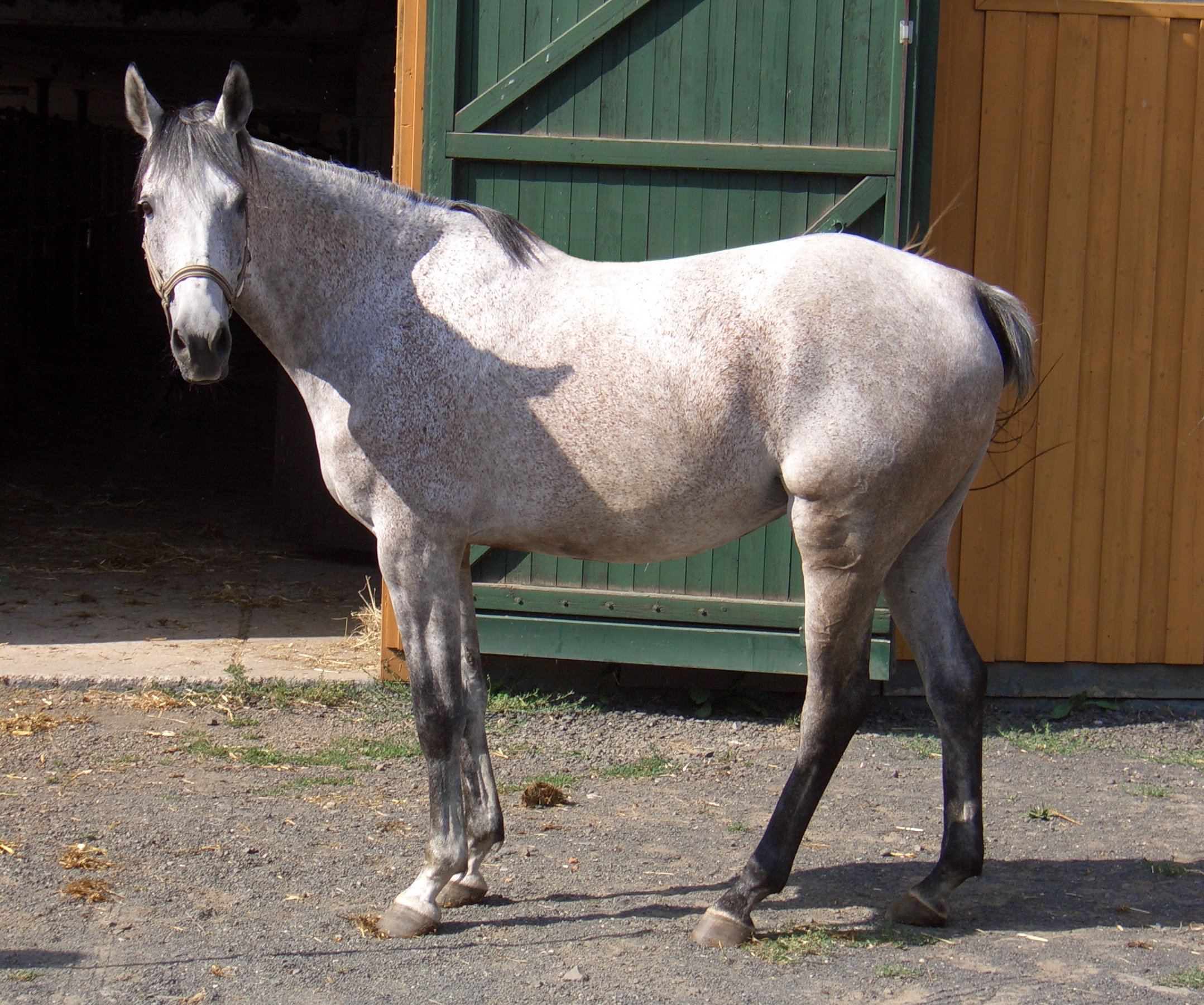

=== QI05AA Inactivated viral vaccines ===
QI05AA01 Equine influenza virus
QI05AA03 Equine rhinopneumonitis virus + equine reovirus + equine influenza virus
QI05AA04 Equine rhinopneumonitis virus + equine influenza virus
QI05AA05 Equine rhinopneumonitis virus
QI05AA06 Equine reovirus
QI05AA07 Equine arteritis virus
QI05AA08 Equine parapox virus
QI05AA09 Equine rotavirus
QI05AA10 West nile virus
QI05AA11 Equine rhinopneumonitis virus + equine abortion virus

=== QI05AB Inactivated bacterial vaccines (including mycoplasma, toxoid and chlamydia) ===
QI05AB01 Streptococcus
QI05AB02 Actinobacillus + escherichia + salmonella + streptococcus
QI05AB03 Clostridium

=== QI05AC Inactivated bacterial vaccines and antisera ===
Empty group

=== QI05AD Live viral vaccines ===
QI05AD01 Equine rhinopneumonitis virus
QI05AD02 Equine influenza virus

=== QI05AE Live bacterial vaccines ===
Empty group

=== QI05AF Live bacterial and viral vaccines ===
Empty group

=== QI05AG Live and inactivated bacterial vaccines ===
Empty group

=== QI05AH Live and inactivated viral vaccines ===
Empty group

=== QI05AI Live viral and inactivated bacterial vaccines ===
QI05AI01 Equine influenza virus + clostridium

=== QI05AJ Live and inactivated viral and bacterial vaccines ===
Empty group

=== QI05AK Inactivated viral and live bacterial vaccines ===
Empty group

=== QI05AL Inactivated viral and inactivated bacterial vaccines ===
QI05AL01 Equine influenza virus + clostridium

=== QI05AM Antisera, immunoglobulin preparations, and antitoxins ===
QI05AM01 Clostridium antiserum
QI05AM02 Antilipopolysacharide antiserum
QI05AM03 Actinobacillus antiserum + escherichia antiserum + salmonella antiserum + streptococcus antiserum

=== QI05AN Live parasitic vaccines ===
Empty group

=== QI05AO Inactivated parasitic vaccines ===
Empty group

=== QI05AP Live fungal vaccines ===
QI05AP01 Trichophyton

=== QI05AQ Inactivated fungal vaccines ===
QI05AQ01 Trichophyton
QI05AQ02 Trichophyton + microsporum

=== QI05AR In vivo diagnostic preparations ===
QI05AR01 Mallein

=== QI05AS Allergens ===
Empty group

=== QI05AT Colostrum preparations and substitutes ===
Empty group

=== QI05AU Other live vaccines ===
Empty group

=== QI05AV Other inactivated vaccines ===
Empty group

=== QI05AX Other immunologicals ===
QI05AX01 Parapox ovis virus, inactivated
QI05AX02 Propionibacterium acnes, inactivated

== QI05B Azinine/donkey ==
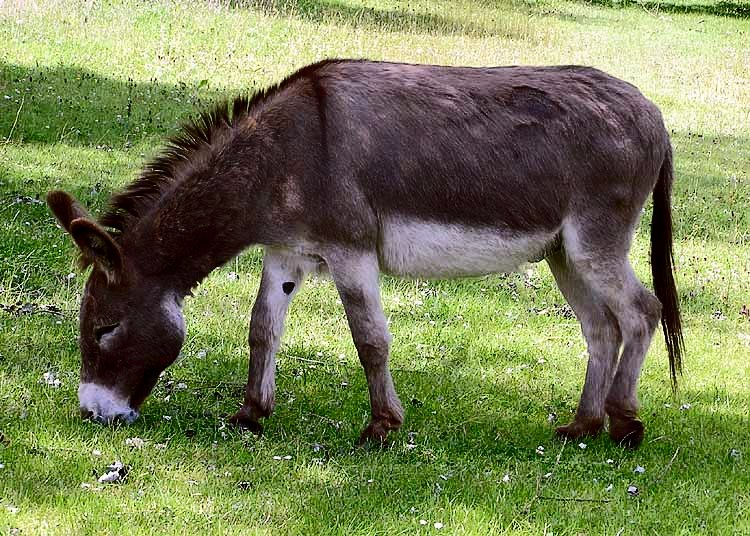

Empty group

== QI05C Hybride ==
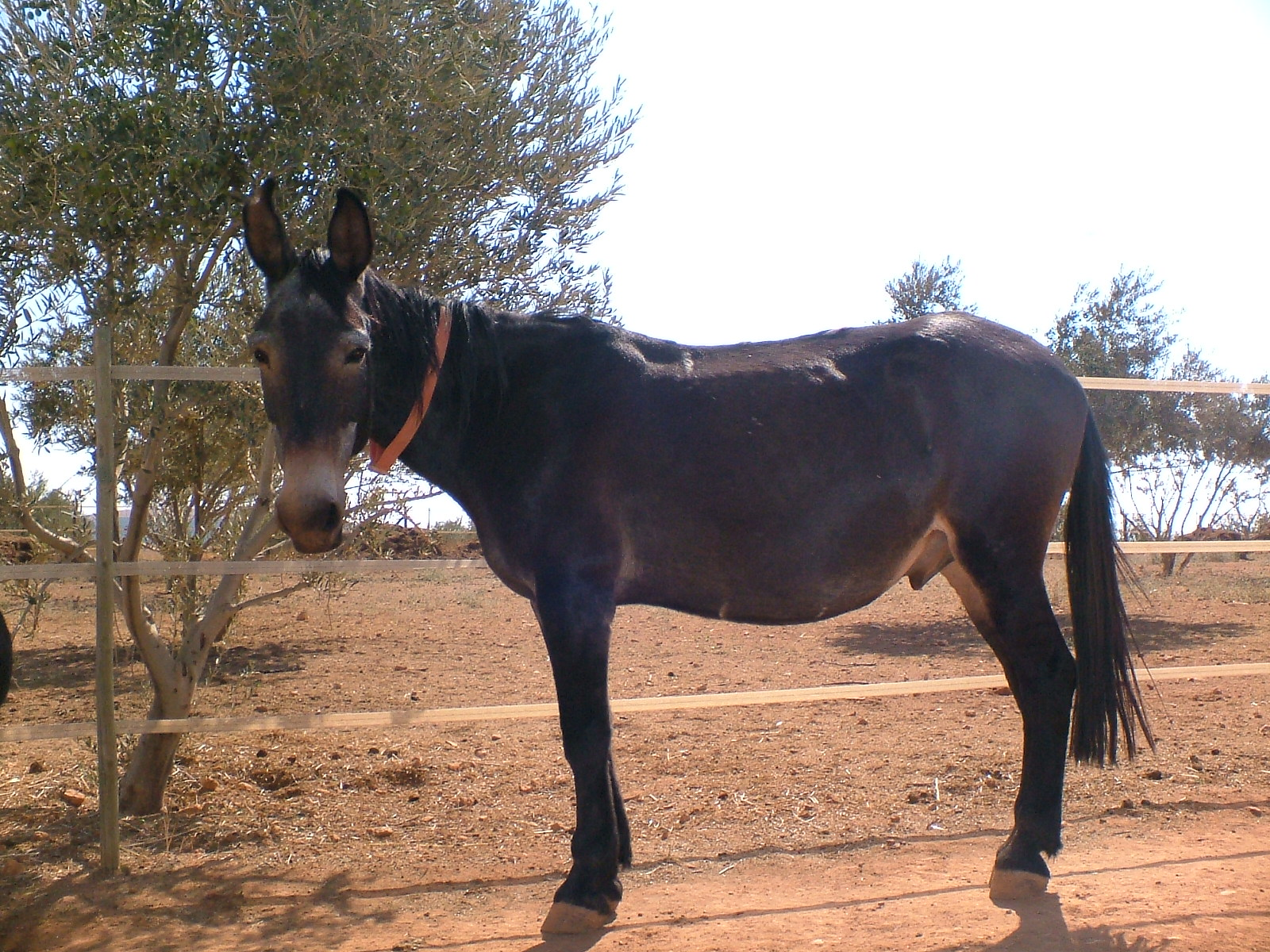

Empty group

== QI05X Equidae, others ==
Empty group
