= Influenza A virus subtype H3N8 =

Virus classification
- (unranked): Virus
- Realm: Riboviria
- Kingdom: Orthornavirae
- Phylum: Negarnaviricota
- Class: Insthoviricetes
- Order: Articulavirales
- Family: Orthomyxoviridae
- Genus: Alphainfluenzavirus
- Species: Influenza A virus
- Serotype: Influenza A virus subtype H3N8

Virus subtype

H3N8 is a subtype of the species Influenza A virus that is endemic in birds, horses and dogs. It is the main cause of equine influenza and is also known as equine influenza virus. In 2011, it was reported to have been found in seals. Cats have been experimentally infected with the virus, leading to clinical signs, shedding of the virus and infection of other cats.

== Introduction ==
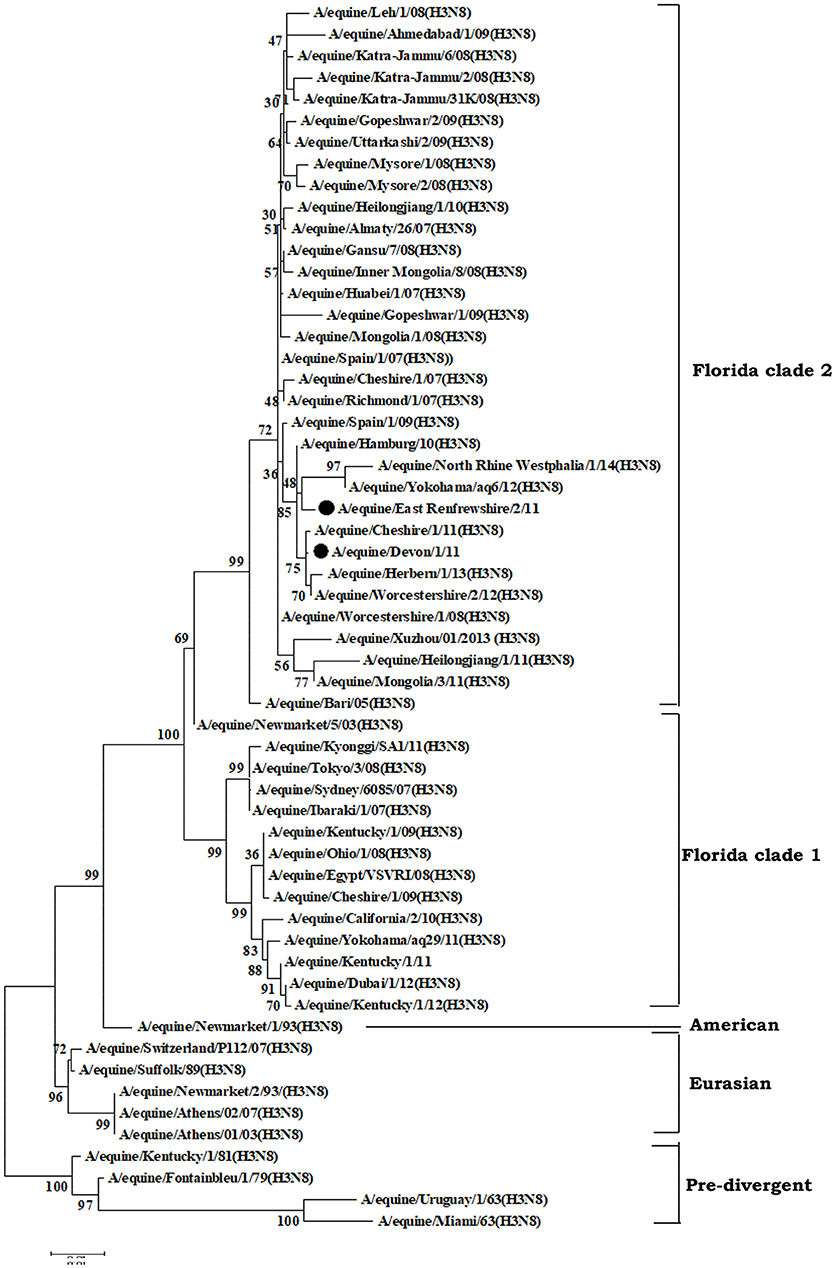
Phylogenetic tree of 57 equine influenza viruses

Equine influenza (EI) is a highly contagious respiratory disease of horses and related animals such as donkeys, mules and zebras (collectively known as equines). Equine influenza is caused by a type A influenza virus in the family Orthomyxoviridae (genus Influenzavirus). Transmission of the equine influenza virus (EIV) to humans has not occurred during outbreaks of the disease in horses. A lineage of H3N8 has been found to infect humans, with the first two cases in China in April and May 2022, and a third case in March 2023, which was the first death.

== History ==
In 1963, the H3N8 (A/equine/2/Miami/63) subtype created an epidemic of equine influenza in Miami and subsequently spread throughout North and South America and Europe, creating massive outbreaks during 1964 and 1965. Since 1963, the H3N8 virus has drifted along a single lineage at a rate of 0.8 amino acid substitutions per year. Between 1978 and 1981, there were widespread epidemics of the A/equine/2 strain throughout the US and Europe despite the development of vaccines. Since the late 1980s, evolution of the H3N8 virus has diverged into two families: an "American-like" lineage and a "European-like" lineage. A 1997 study found H3N8 was responsible for over one quarter of the influenza infections in wild ducks.

H3N8 has been suggested as a possible cause of the 1889–1890 pandemic in humans, and also another epidemic in 1898–1900. Before the identification of H3N8 as a possible cause of the 1889 pandemic, the H2N2 subtype was suggested. At this point, it is not possible to identify the virus for either the 1889 or 1900 outbreak with certainty.

== Route of transmission ==
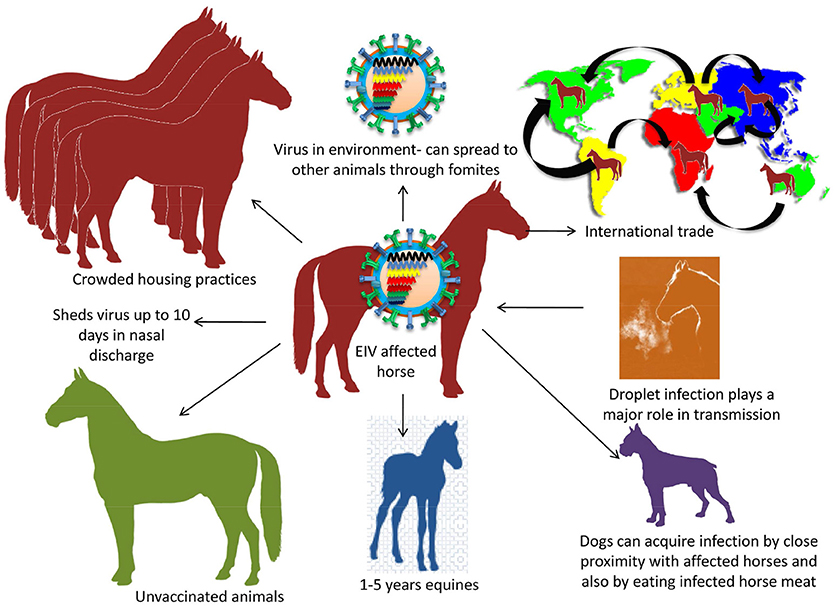
Transmission routes of EIV

Equine influenza virus (H3N8) can be spread by a few different routes. The ultimate source of the virus is respiratory tract secretions. Coughing horses can release the virus into the air, where it can spread up to 30–50 metres. It can also be spread by direct contact between horses, or indirectly via a person's hands or clothing, or on inanimate objects (e.g. buckets, tack, twitches). However, the virus doesn't survive outside of a horse for long. The virus is delicate within the environment and easily killed by heat, cold, desiccation, and disinfectants. The virus multiplies in epithelial cells of upper respiratory tract. Dispersed by aerosol droplets when horse coughs or exhales. The virus can survive in the environment, on different surfaces, for up to 48 hours. Spread of the disease has been associated with the movement of people, pets, horse equipment and tack where proper biosecurity procedures have not been followed.

Subclinical infection with virus shedding can occur in vaccinated horses, particularly where there is a mismatch between the vaccine strains and the virus strains circulating in the field. Such infections contribute to the spread of the disease.

== Incubation period ==
The incubation period of H3N8 is quite short for equine influenza, typically lasting about one to three days, though the incubation period of some cases may be as long as seven. This makes control of the disease easier, as infected horses can be sooner identified, subsequently reducing the time before proper control measures can be enacted.

== Pathophysiology ==
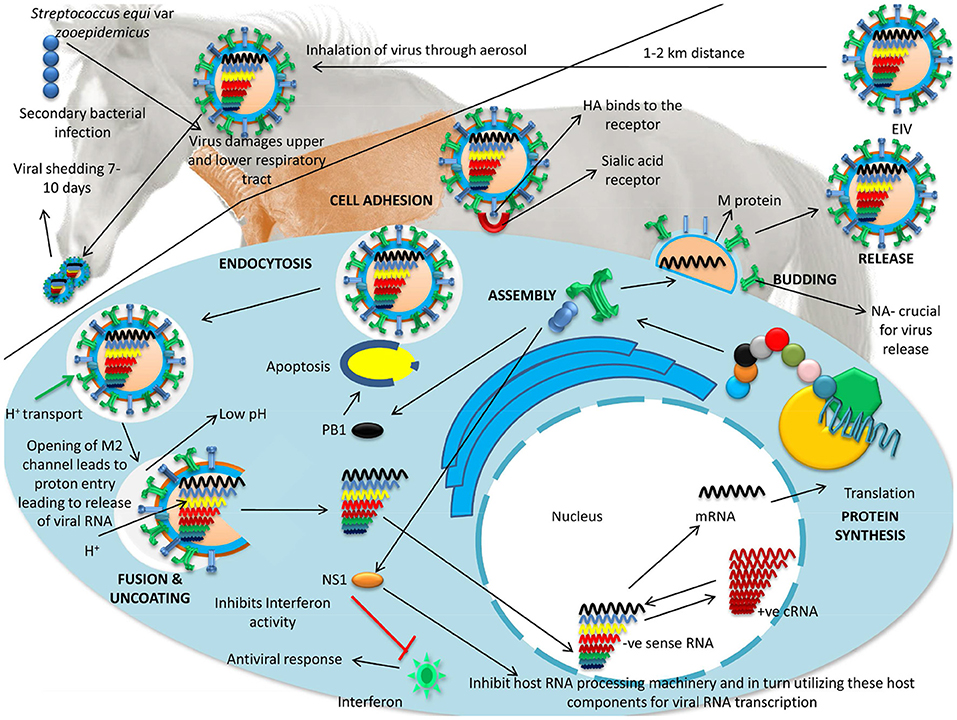
Life cycle and pathogenesis of EIV

Aerosolized influenza virus is inhaled and embeds in the respiratory mucosa, of the upper and lower respiratory tract. The virus is attracted to the glycoproteins and mucopolysaccharides of the mucus coating the respiratory mucosa. If the infecting dose of virus is high, abundant viral neuraminidase breaks down the mucosal layer, allowing access of the virus to the underlying epithelial cells. The virus then attaches to epithelial cells through binding of the hemagglutinin spike to the N-acetylneuraminic acid receptor on the cell. The virus then enters the cell by endocytosis into the cell cytoplasm where it replicates to produce new virions that are released back into the respiratory tract by budding from the infected cell. The virus disperses throughout the trachea and bronchial tree within 3 days, causing hyperemia, edema, necrosis, desquamation, and focal erosion. Viremia is rare, but is possible if the virus crosses the basement membrane and enters the circulation, potentially causing inflammation of skeletal and cardiac muscle (myositis and myocarditis), encephalitic signs, and limb edema

== Diagnosis ==
Fever of 102.5–105.0 °F (39.2–40.6 °C), frequent dry cough for several weeks, ‘drippy’ nose with discharge and secondary bacterial infection are some of the clinical signs of Equine influenza virus infection. isolation of influenza virus from nasopharyngeal and or large rise in antibody titer in equine-1 or 2 serum can be used as diagnosis in horses. Other clinical findings may include a serous or light mucoid nasal discharge, epiphora, tender but rarely swollen submandibular lymph nodes, hyperemia of nasal and conjunctival mucosa, tachypnea, tachycardia, limb edema, muscle soreness and stiffness.

== Period of infectivity ==
The length of time a horse can spread the virus after being infected. It is a very important concept, because horses can still infect other horses after they have gotten over their own illness. Viruses that are shed for long periods of time after a horse gets better are much harder to control. Horses tend to be most infectious (i.e. shedding the most virus) in the first 24–48 hours after they develop a fever, but they can shed the virus for up to 7–10 days after their signs of illness disappear.

== See also ==
- Horse flu
- Dog flu
