= Testudinid herpesvirus 3 =

Virus classification
- (unranked): Virus
- Realm: Duplodnaviria
- Kingdom: Heunggongvirae
- Phylum: Peploviricota
- Class: Herviviricetes
- Order: Herpesvirales
- Family: Orthoherpesviridae
- Genus: Scutavirus
- Species: Scutavirus testudinidalpha3

Synonyms
- Testudinid alphaherpesvirus 3; Testudinid herpesvirus 3

Species of virus

Testudinid herpesvirus 3 (TeHV-3) is a species of virus in the family Orthoherpesviridae.
