= Scutavirus =

Virus classification
- (unranked): Virus
- Realm: Duplodnaviria
- Kingdom: Heunggongvirae
- Phylum: Peploviricota
- Class: Herviviricetes
- Order: Herpesvirales
- Family: Orthoherpesviridae
- Subfamily: Alphaherpesvirinae
- Genus: Scutavirus

Species
- See text

Genus of viruses

Scutavirus is a genus of viruses in the order Herpesvirales, in the family Orthoherpesviridae, in the subfamily Alphaherpesvirinae. Turtles and tortoises serve as natural hosts. Diseases associated with this genus include fibropapillomatosis.

== Species ==
The genus contains the following species, listed by scientific name and followed by the common name of the species:

- Scutavirus chelonidalpha5, Chelonid herpesvirus 5
- Scutavirus testudinidalpha3, Testudinid herpesvirus 3

== Structure ==
Viruses in Scutavirus are enveloped, with icosahedral, spherical to pleomorphic, and round geometries, and T=16 symmetry. The diameter is around 150-200 nm. Genomes are linear and non-segmented.

Genus	Structure	Symmetry	Capsid	Genomic arrangement	Genomic segmentation
Scutavirus	Spherical pleomorphic	T=16	Enveloped	Linear	Monopartite

== Life cycle ==
Viral replication is nuclear, and is lysogenic. Entry into the host cell is achieved by attachment of the viral gB, gC, gD and gH proteins to host receptors, which mediates endocytosis. Replication follows the dsDNA bidirectional replication model. DNA-templated transcription, with some alternative splicing mechanism is the method of transcription. The virus exits the host cell by nuclear egress, and budding. Turtles and tortoises serve as the natural host.

Genus	Host details	Tissue tropism	Entry details	Release details	Replication site	Assembly site	Transmission
Scutavirus	Turtles and tortoises	None	Cell receptor endocytosis	Budding	Nucleus	Nucleus	Aerosol
