= Equine influenza =

Influenza caused by viruses adapted to horses

Equine influenza (horse flu) is the disease caused by strains of influenza A that are enzootic in horse species. Equine influenza occurs globally, previously caused by two main strains of virus: equine-1 (H7N7) and equine-2 (H3N8). The World Organisation for Animal Health now considers H7N7 strains likely to be extinct since these strains have not been isolated for over 20 years. Predominant international circulating H3N8 strains are Florida sublineage of the American lineage; clade 1 predominates in the Americas and clade 2 in Europe. (Elton and Cullinane, 2013; Paillot, 2014; Slater et al., 2013). The disease has a nearly 100% infection rate in an unvaccinated horse population with no prior exposure to the virus.

While equine influenza is historically not known to affect humans, impacts of past outbreaks have been devastating due to the economic reliance on horses for communication (postal service), military (cavalry), and general transportation. In modern times the ramifications of equine influenza are most clear in the horse-racing industry.

== Clinical Signs ==
Equine influenza is characterized by a very high rate of transmission among horses, and has a relatively short incubation time of one to three days. Clinical signs of equine influenza include fever (up to 106 °F [41 °C]), nasal discharge, have a dry, hacking cough, depression, loss of appetite and weakness. Secondary infections may include pneumonia. Horses that are mildly affected will recover within 2 to 3 weeks; however, it may take up to 6 months for recovery for severely affected horses. Horses that become immune may not show signs but will still shed the virus.

An 1872 report on equine influenza describes the disease as:

"An epizootic specific fever of a very debilitating type, with inflammation of the respiratory mucous membrane, and less frequently of other organs, having an average duration of ten to fifteen days, and not conferring immunity from a second attack in subsequent epizootics."

— James Law, Report of the Commissioner of Agriculture for the year 1872

== Causes ==
Equine influenza is caused by several strains of the influenza A virus endemic to horses. Viruses that cause equine influenza were first isolated in 1956. The equine-1 virus affects heart muscle, while the equine-2 virus is much more severe and systemic. The virus is spread by infected, coughing horses in addition to contaminated buckets, brushes, tack and other stable equipment. The influenza virus causes symptoms by replicating within respiratory epithelial cells, resulting in destruction of tracheal and bronchial epithelium and cilia.

== Treatment ==
When a horse contracts the equine influenza virus, rest and supportive care is advised so that complications do not occur. Veterinarians recommend at least one week of rest for every day that the fever persists with a minimum of three days' rest. This allows the damaged mucociliary apparatus to regenerate. Non-steroidal anti-inflammatory drugs are administered if the fever reaches greater than 104 °F (40 °C). If complications occur, such as the onset of pneumonia, or if the fever last more than 3 to 4 days, antibiotics are often administered.

== Prevention ==
Prevention of equine influenza outbreaks is maintained through vaccines and hygiene procedures. Isolation of horses for two weeks is common practice when they are being moved to a new environment.

=== Vaccines ===
Vaccines (ATCvet codes: QI05AA01 (WHO) inactivated, QI05AD02 (WHO) live, plus various combinations) are a major defense against the disease. Vaccination schedules generally require a primary course of vaccines, followed by booster shots. It is recommended that horses be vaccinated against equine influenza annually, and competition horses that travel frequently be given a booster every six months as they are at higher risk of contracting the virus. Foals are initially vaccinated at six months of age with a booster 3 to 6 weeks later and again between 10 and 12 months. Standard schedules may not maintain absolutely foolproof levels of protection, and more frequent administration is advised in high-risk situations.

Equine influenza virus (EIV) undergoes continuous antigenic drift, and vaccine protection from immunogenic stimulation is maximised when vaccines strains have greater homogeneity to circulating strains. Subclinically affected vaccinated horses can shed live virus and represent a threat to unvaccinated or inappropriately vaccinated horses. Neutralising immunity leading to an absence of infection is rare. (Paillot, 2014) An OIE expert surveillance panel annually assesses circulating strains and makes relevant vaccine recommendations.

The UK requires horses participating in show events be vaccinated against equine flu, and a vaccination card must be produced. The International Federation for Equestrian Sports requires vaccination every six months.

== History ==
A comprehensive report describing the disease—compiled in response to the 1872 outbreak of the disease in North America—provided a thorough examination of the history of the disease.

=== Early records ===
The report notes putative cases dating as far back as Hippocrates and Livius. Absyrtus, a Greek veterinarian from 330 CE, described a disease in the horse population having the general characters of influenza, which the report mentions as the earliest clear record of equine influenza in the lower animals.

The report notes the next recorded equine influenza case in 1299, the same year that a catarrhal epidemic affected Europe. Spanish records noted cases in which "The horse carried his head drooping, would eat nothing, ran from the eyes, and there was hurried beating of the flanks. The malady was epidemic, and in that year one thousand horses died."

Prevalence of influenza is found in historic records in the centuries of the Middle Ages, but direct implication of horses is not always clear. Neither are recorded instances of record deaths among horses and other animals clear on the exact cause of death.

=== 1872 North American outbreak ===
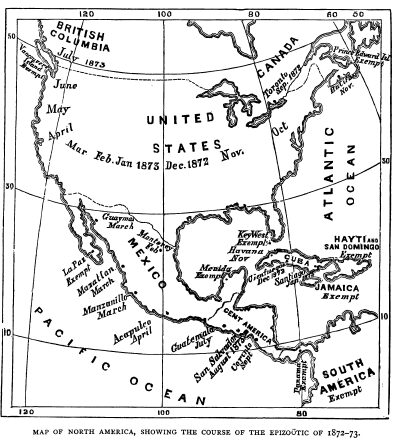
Spread of epizootic

An epizootic outbreak of equine influenza during 1872 in North America became known as "The Great Epizootic of 1872". The outbreak is known as the "most destructive recorded episode of equine influenza in history". In 1870, three fourths of Americans lived in rural areas (towns under 2,500 population, and farms). Horse and mule power was used for moving wagons and carriages, and pulling plows and farm equipment. The census of 1870 counted 7.1 million horses and 1.1 million mules, as well as 39 million humans. With most urban horses and mules incapacitated for a week or two, humans used wheelbarrows and pulled the wagons. About 1% of the animals died, and the rest fully recovered.

The first cases of the disease were reported from Ontario, Canada. By October 1, 1872, the first case occurred in Toronto. All the streetcar horses and major livery stables were affected within only three days. By the middle of October, the disease had reached Montreal, Detroit, and New England. On October 25, 1872, The New York Times reported on the extent of the outbreak, claiming that nearly all public stables in the city had been affected, and that the majority of the horses owned in the private sector had essentially been rendered useless to their owners. Only days later, the Times went on to report that 95% of all horses in Rochester, New York, had been affected, while the disease was also making its way quickly through the state of Maine and had already affected all fire horses in the city of Providence, Rhode Island.

On October 30, 1872, The New York Times reported that a complete suspension of travel had been noted in the state. The same report also took note of massive freight backups being caused by the lack of transportation ability that was arising as a result of the outbreak. Cities such as Buffalo and New York were left without effective ways to move merchandise through the streets, and even the Erie Canal was left with boats full of goods idling in its waters because they were pulled by horses. By November, many states were reporting cases. The street railway industry ground to a halt in late 1872.

Boston was hard hit by a major fire downtown on November 9 as firemen pulled the necessary firefighting equipment by hand. The city commission investigating the fire found that fire crews' response times were delayed by only a matter of minutes. The city then began to buy steam-powered equipment.

In New York, 7,000 of the city's approximately 11,000 horses fell ill, and mortality rates ranged between 1.0% and 10%. Many horses were unable to stand in their stalls; those that could stand coughed violently and were too weak to pull any loads or support riders. The vast majority of affected horses that survived were back to full health by the following spring.

In December 1872, Mexico sent aid to the United States in the form of live horses.

=== 2003 UK outbreak ===
An outbreak involving 1,300 horses in 21 racing stables occurred in Newmarket in Spring 2003. Racing was not cancelled.

=== 2004 United States outbreak: H3N8 transfer to dogs ===
The equine influenza virus H3N8 caused an influenza outbreak in dogs in the United States. The infection in dogs was first noticed in Greyhound race dogs in January 2004. The exposure and transfer apparently occurred at horse-racing tracks where dog racing had also occurred.

=== 2007 Australian outbreak ===
Australia had remained free of equine influenza until an outbreak in August 2007 when 10,651 horses were infected over a period of three months. The cost to eradicate the disease was estimated at $1 billion and eventually the virus was successfully contained and Australia has returned to its equine influenza-free status. However, the outbreak had significant effects on the country's horse-racing industry and the Australian economy in general.

=== 2019 UK outbreaks ===
In February 2019, an outbreak led to horse-racing meetings being cancelled in Britain between February 7 and February 12, after horses from an infected yard in Cheshire had raced the previous day. Following the first three cases at these stables, a further three cases were reported. It became known that there had recently been several outbreaks across Europe, and 7 in the UK since the start of 2019. In the latest incident, initially three vaccinated horses tested positive, resulting in the British Horseracing Authority (BHA) calling off races and putting in place "quarantine and biosecurity measures". The BHA stated "The full extent of potential exposure is unknown". The disease has been spreading across northern Europe, with the Republic of Ireland, France, Belgium and the Netherlands all affected.

Within the week following the initial UK infections, four further vaccinated horses tested positive for equine flu in stables in Newmarket, but after six days the BHA declared that (with stricter rules regarding vaccinations) racing would resume. While some in the industry welcomed the resumption of racing, Dr Richard Newton, of the Animal Health Trust warned that British racing is "not out of the woods yet". Eight times as many flu cases were reported among UK horses in the first six weeks of 2019 as in the whole of 2018, and there was particular concern about its appearance in vaccinated horses and thoroughbreds.

The outbreak continued at an elevated rate for the first half of the year and a peak in cases was seen at the end of June. From mid-August only isolated sporadic cases were seen.

== See also ==
- Avian influenza
- Canine influenza
