= Sea turtle tornovirus 1 =

Virus classification
- Group: Group II (ssDNA)
- Species: Sea turtle tornovirus 1

Sea turtle tornovirus 1 is a single stranded DNA virus that was isolated from a turtle with fibropapillomatosis in 2009.

== Virology ==
The genome is circular and ~1.8 kilobases in length with a G+C content of ~50%. It has at least three open reading frames (ORF 1, 2, 3) and two others (ORF 4 and 5) may also be present. The genome is of negative polarity.

ORF 1 possesses a putative nuclear localization signal at its N terminal. ORF 2 has some homology to the viral protein 2 of chicken anaemia virus. ORF 3 has no homology to any known protein. Similarly neither ORF 4 or 5 have any homology with any known protein. The functions of these proteins is not known.

A TATA box (sequence—TATAAA) and a poly adenosine signal (sequence—AATAAA) are present in the genome.

== Taxonomy ==
The final classification of this virus has yet to be decided.

It has a low level of homology to the Circovirus chicken anemia virus.

== Clinical ==
The virus can be isolated from the blood and all the major organs as well as the fibropapilloma.

== Genome sequences ==
Listing: https://www.ncbi.nlm.nih.gov/nuccore?term=EU867816:EU867824[pacc]
