= Monodontid alphaherpesvirus 1 =

Varicellovirus monodontidalpha1

Virus classification
- (unranked): Virus
- Realm: Duplodnaviria
- Kingdom: Heunggongvirae
- Phylum: Peploviricota
- Class: Herviviricetes
- Order: Herpesvirales
- Family: Orthoherpesviridae
- Genus: Varicellovirus
- Species: Varicellovirus monodontidalpha1

Synonyms
- Monodontid alphaherpesvirus 1

Species of virus

Monodontid alphaherpesvirus 1 (MoHV-1) is a species of virus in the family Herpesviridae. The virus is able to infect narwhals and beluga whales. The name of the virus stems from the scientific name of the Narwhal, Monodon Monoceros.
