= Horse sheath cleaning =

Equine hygiene procedure

Sheath cleaning is a hygienic process occasionally needed by male horses, both geldings and stallions, wherein a caretaker, groom or veterinarian checks the horse's sheath, the pocket of skin that protects the penis of the horse when it is not in use for urination (or, in the case of stallions, breeding). This area may need to be cleaned, starting at a young age after breeding and the birth season, but particularly in geldings. In addition to accumulations of smegma, a waxy substance that includes dirt and dead skin cells, some geldings (and occasionally, stallions) may also form a "bean", a hardened ball of smegma inside the sheath or even the urethra that, in extreme cases, can interfere with urine flow. Although a gelding retains the same beneficial microorganisms in the sheath as a stallion, they seem to accumulate smegma and other debris at a higher rate, probably because geldings rarely fully extrude the penis, and thus dirt and smegma build up in the folds of skin. Thus, it is recommended that the sheath be cleaned once or twice a year. Cleaning the sheath is a specialized task requiring a mild cleaner with grease-cutting properties, generally designed specifically for the process, along with warm water and many clean (usually disposable) towels. Rubber gloves for the handler are recommended, as the job is rather smelly and messy.

Some horses object to sheath cleaning and require sedation, others will tolerate it if the groom is careful and patient, though light sedation may help the horse "drop" for easier cleaning. Ideally, the horse will be desensitized by careful training to tolerate the procedure. To begin, a gentle stream of warm water is run into the sheath from a hose or a large, needleless syringe. This will loosen and soften some of the material and make it easier to remove. The process requires either that the horse "drop" his penis or that the groom reach up inside of the sheath to pull the penis gently from the sheath by the glans (head) in order to apply cleaner and carefully clean the entire region. The "bean" is often found in the urethral diverticulum, a pocket adjacent to the opening of the urethra, so that area must also be checked. While a veterinarian can clean a sheath, it is not a medical procedure and can be done by any person who learns the proper method.
