= Metritis =

Inflammation of the wall of the uterus

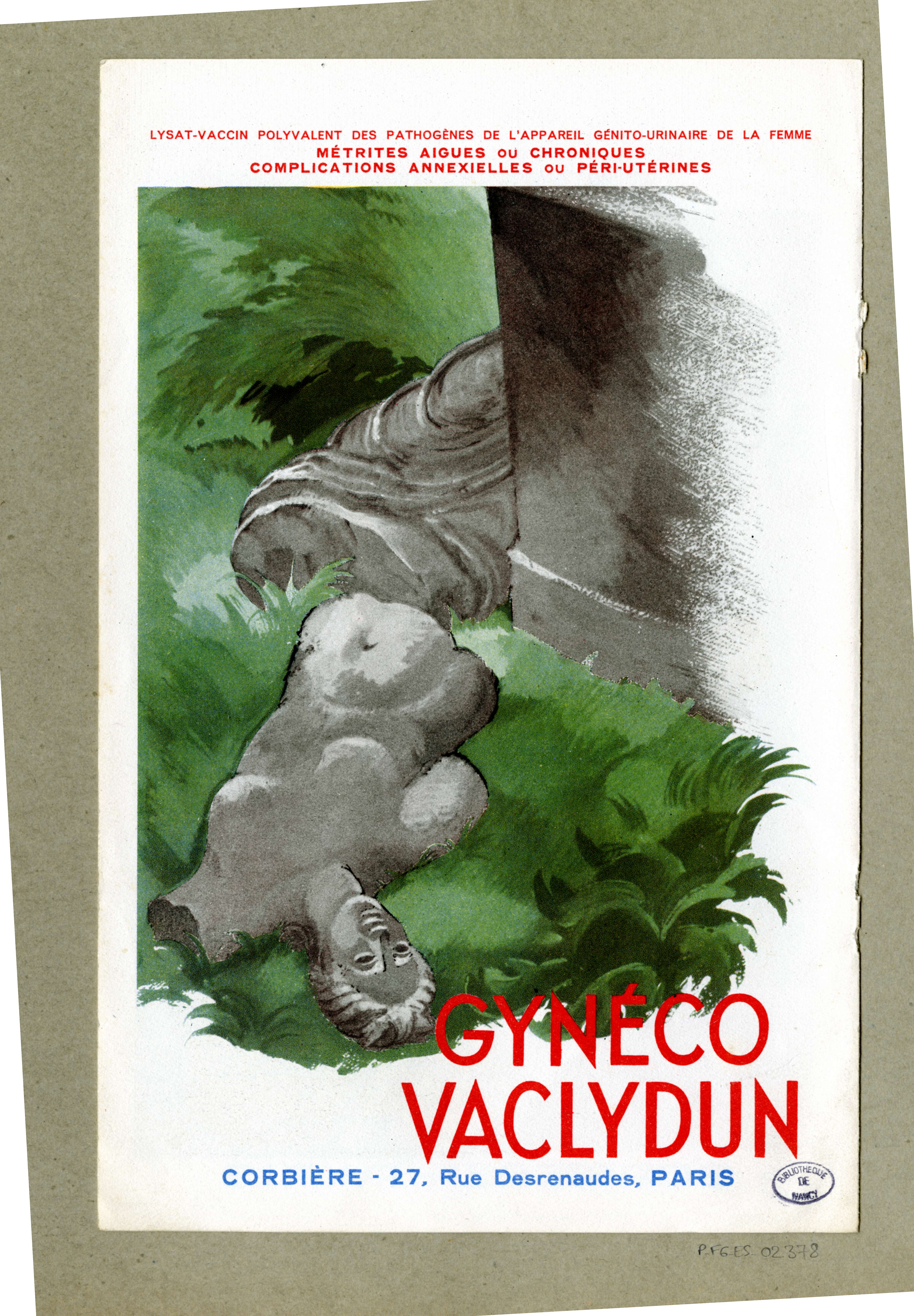
Early 20th-century French advertisement for an anti-metritis vaccine

Metritis is inflammation of the wall of the uterus, whereas endometritis is inflammation of the functional lining of the uterus, called the endometrium. The term pelvic inflammatory disease (PID) is often used for metritis.

== Definitions ==
Postpartum metritis, also known as puerperal sepsis, occurs within 21 days and is most common within 10 days of delivery. Metritis is characterized by an enlarged uterus and a watery red-brown fluid to viscous off-white purulent uterine discharge, which often has a bad smell. The severity of disease is categorized by the signs of health:

- Grade 1 metritis: An abnormally enlarged uterus and a purulent uterine discharge without any systemic signs of ill health.
- Grade 2 metritis: Animals with additional signs of systemic illness such as decreased milk yield, dullness, and fever >39.5 °C.
- Grade 3 metritis: Animals with signs of toxemia such as inappetence, cold extremities, depression, and/or collapse.

Clinical endometritis is defined in cattle as the presence of a purulent uterine discharge detectable in the vagina 21 days or more postpartum. Simple grading systems for clinical disease are based on the character of the vaginal mucus and typical Grading schemes for clinical endometritis are widely used by veterinarians.

Subclinical endometritis is characterized by inflammation of the endometrium and the presence of neutrophils in cytology or biopsy histology, in the absence of signs of clinical endometritis.

== Other animals ==
These terms can apply to any species of mammal. Amongst domestic animals, metritis and endometritis are most common in cattle after parturition, and the diseases are often called postpartum metritis or postpartum endometritis. These diseases in cattle are caused by bacteria and occasionally viruses. The most common bacteria that cause postpartum metritis and endometritis in cattle are Escherichia coli, Trueperella (previously Arcanobacterium) pyogenes and anaerobic bacteria such as Prevotella species and Fusobacterium necrophorum. The virus most consistently associated with postpartum uterine disease in cattle is Bovine Herpesvirus 4 (BoHV-4). In addition, "Several specific diseases are associated with metritis or endometritis. These include brucellosis, leptospirosis, campylobacteriosis, and trichomoniasis"

In cattle, bacterial infection of the uterus affects almost all animals after parturition. This does not mean they will get disease. Beef cattle rarely have disease unless they have a predisposing factor such as retained placenta or difficult parturition. However, uterine disease is common in dairy cattle - particularly high-milk-yield cows such as Holstein-Friesian cows.

Contagious equine metritis is a sexually transmitted infection in horses, recognized since 1977.

In 2014, a study reported about the first successful vaccination trials in cattle. The infection rate declined significantly.

== Etymology and pronunciation ==
The word metritis (/məˈtraɪtɪs/ or /miˈtraɪtɪs/) uses combining forms of metr- + -itis, yielding "uterus inflammation".
