= Simian varicella virus =

Virus classification
- (unranked): Virus
- Realm: Duplodnaviria
- Kingdom: Heunggongvirae
- Phylum: Peploviricota
- Class: Herviviricetes
- Order: Herpesvirales
- Family: Orthoherpesviridae
- Genus: Varicellovirus
- Species: Varicellovirus cercopithecinealpha9

Synonyms
- Cercopithecine alphaherpesvirus 9; Simian varicella virus (SVV)

Species of virus

Simian varicella virus (SVV) is a species of virus in the genus Varicellovirus, subfamily Alphaherpesvirinae, family Orthoherpesviridae, and order Herpesvirales.

== Pathology ==
SVV infects primates and shares clinical, pathological, immunological, and virological features with varicella-zoster virus infection of humans. Monkeys that had been inoculated intratracheally with the virus developed diffuse varicella 10 to 12 days later. Monkeys that were caged with each of the intratracheally infected monkeys developed a mild rash two weeks later, hence providing evidence of airborne transmission.
