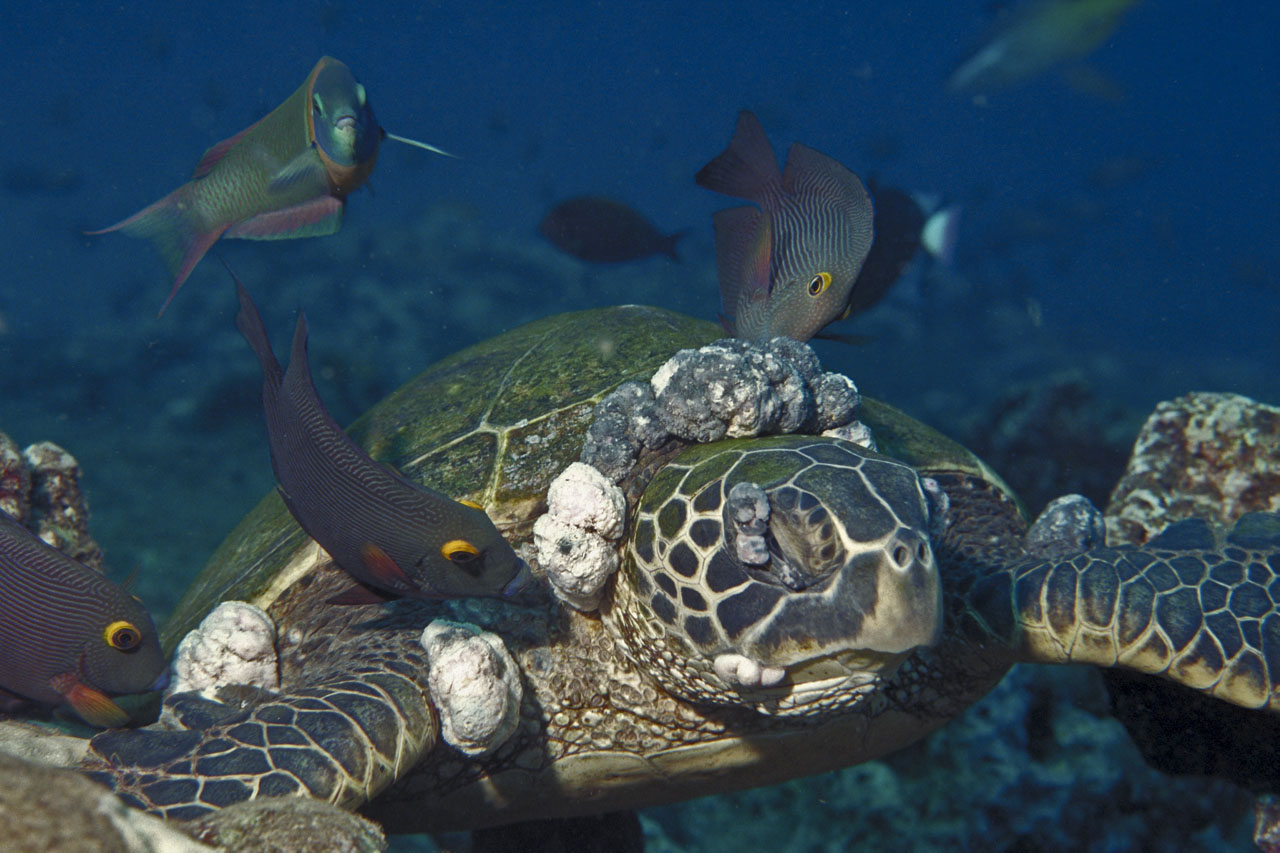
- Hawaiian green turtle with severe fibropapilloma tumors. Cleaner wrasses avoid feeding on the tumours.

Virus classification
- (unranked): Virus
- Realm: Duplodnaviria
- Kingdom: Heunggongvirae
- Phylum: Peploviricota
- Class: Herviviricetes
- Order: Herpesvirales
- Family: Orthoherpesviridae
- Genus: Scutavirus
- Species: Scutavirus chelonidalpha5

Synonyms
- Chelonid alphaherpesvirus 5; Chelonid herpesvirus 5

= Turtle fibropapillomatosis =

Chelonid herpesvirus 5

Species of virus

Turtle fibropapillomatosis (FP) is a disease of sea turtles. The condition is characterized by benign but ultimately debilitating epithelial tumours on the surface of biological tissues. FP exists all over the world, but it is most prominent in warmer climates, affecting up to 50–70% of some populations.

The causative agent of the disease is believed to be Chelonid herpesvirus 5 (ChHV-5), a species of virus in the genus Scutavirus, subfamily Alphaherpesvirinae, family Orthoherpesviridae, and order Herpesvirales. Turtle leeches are suspected mechanical vectors, transmitting the disease to other individuals. The disease is thought to have a multifactorial cause, including a tumour-promoting phase that is possibly caused by biotoxins or contaminants.

== Description ==
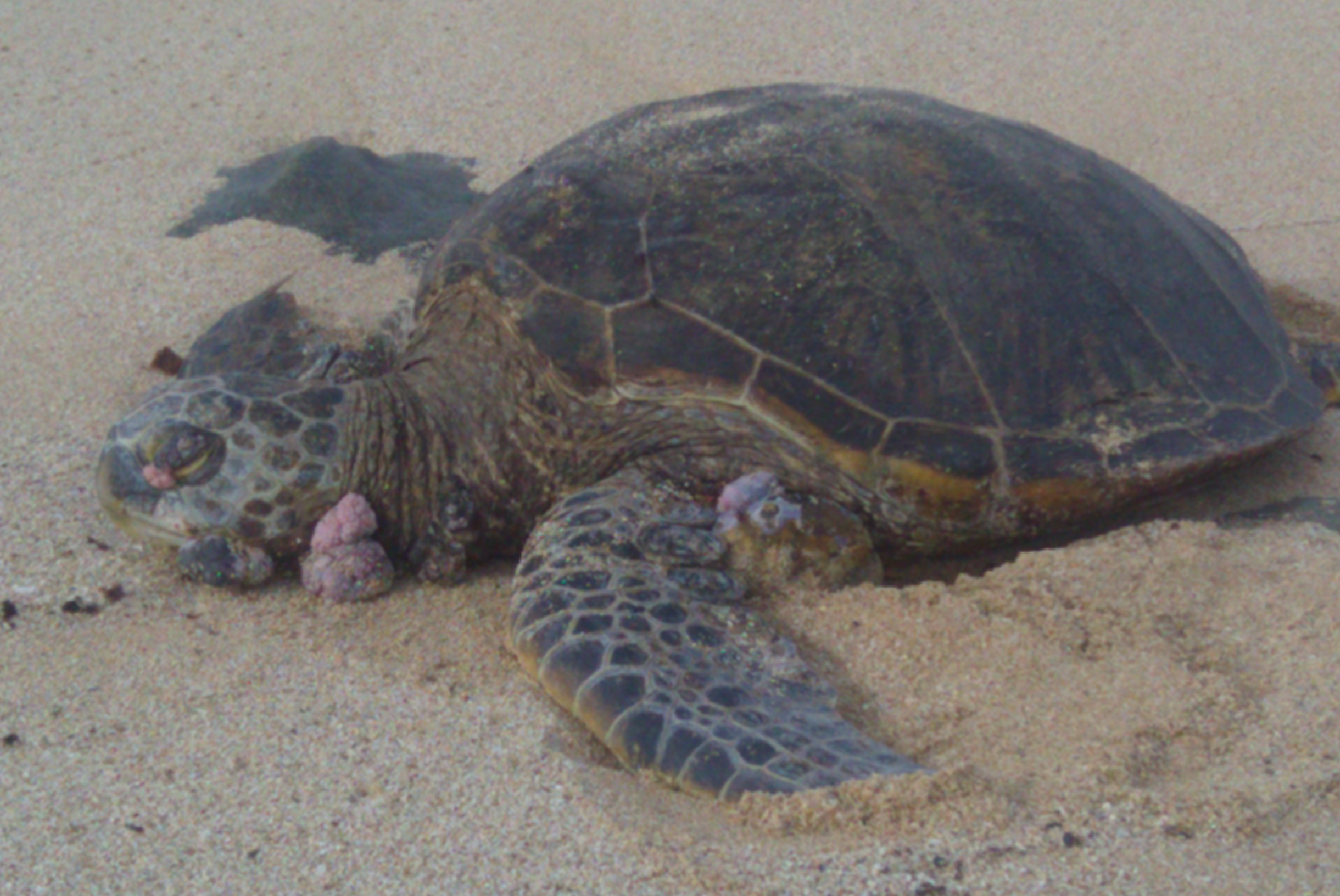
A green sea turtle with significant fibropapilloma tumours basking on a beach north of Haleiwa, HI

Fibropapillomatosis is a benign tumour disease of marine turtles, predominantly in the green sea turtle, Chelonia mydas, but it has also been reported in the loggerhead sea turtle Caretta caretta, olive ridley Lepidochelys olivacea, Kemp's ridley Lepidochelys kempii, and leatherbacks Dermochelys coriacea. This neoplastic disease causes proliferation of papillary cells (hyperplasia) and gives rise to excess fibrous connective tissue in both epidermal and dermal skin layers – or more specifically, proliferation of dermal fibroblasts and epidermal keratinocytes. This causes tumorigenesis in sizes less than 1 cm up to more than 30 cm in diameter. FP is most often found externally around the armpits, genitals, neck, eyes, and tails of turtles, but also occur in and around the mouth, and rarely in internal organs or on the carapace. This, in turn, impedes vision, feeding, and movement. Around 25–30% of turtles with external tumours also have internal tumours, primarily in heart, lungs and kidneys.

FP incidence is highest among immature and juvenile green turtles, while it is rare in adults. The suggestions for this pattern include the tumours can regress and be cured, which has been documented in some individuals, even when tumours were severe. However, the responses that cause these tumour regressions is unknown. Secondly, the juvenile individuals with FP might die before reaching adulthood.

=== Prognosis ===
The tumours appear to be benign and can be present for many years, but if large, can mechanically hamper sight, swallowing, and swimming, which may ultimately be fatal. While external tumours hamper movement and sight, internal tumours interfere with system functioning, another potentially fatal factor. As the tumours progress, individuals with large numbers of tumours may become anaemic, have a lack of proteins and iron, and in more advanced stages even suffer from acidosis caused by imbalanced calcium/phosphorus ratios and severe emaciation.

=== Other species ===
Fibropapillomas are present in other animal groups, but are caused by different viruses, for example the bovine papillomavirus.

== History ==
The first documented case of the disease was in 1938 in Key West, Florida. Long-term studies found no signs of the disease on Florida's Atlantic coast in the 1970s, but during the 1980s FP was recorded in incidences varying from 28 to 67%. Today, incidences as high as 92% have been reported in Kaneohe Bay, Oahu, Hawaii. Generally, FP is most prominent in warmer climates. Recent research has found that FP is caused by stress and tumours have been observed in turtles that are part of turtle tourism tours.

== Cause ==
The FP is an infectious disease with horizontal transmission. An alphaherpesvirus called fibropapilloma-associated turtle herpesvirus (FPTHV) and Chelonid herpesvirus 5 is believed to be the causative agent of the disease. The reason for this belief is because nearly all tissue samples tested from turtles with lesions carry genetic material of this herpesvirus, varying between 95 and 100% depending on different studies and locations. The DNA loads of the herpesvirus in tumour tissue are 2.5–4.5 logarithms higher than in uninfected tissue. The FPTHV herpesvirus has been found in turtles free from FP and this suggest that the FP progression is multifactorial and might even involve some sort of tumour-promoting phase. The global prevalence of the disease also suggests a multifactorial cause, rather than single factors or agents. Possible factors include some parasites, bacteria, environmental pollutants, UV-light, changing water temperatures and biotoxins. Even physiological factors such as stress and immunologic status appear to be associated with FP.

The leech genus Ozobranchus is thought to be the mechanical vector of the herpesvirus, transmitting the virus from one turtle to another. These leeches are common turtle ectoparasites that exclusively feed on turtle blood, and some leeches have been found carrying more than 10 million copies of the herpesvirus DNA. The green sea turtle is an herbivore and feeds primarily on seagrass and macroalgae. Two toxins which are suspected to be associated with FP are found epiphytically on these plants. First, the toxic compound lyngbyatoxin from the cyanobacterium Lyngbya majuscule, and second the toxin okadaic acid – a documented tumour-promoting toxin - from the dinoflagellate Prorocentrum. Again, causality has not been concluded, but an association seems to exist between the distribution of especially the dinoflagellates and the occurrence of FP, and as they are found on weeds, they can be ingested by foraging green sea turtles. Turtles with FP are found to have a compromised immune system. They have higher phagocytic leucocyte counts (especially heterophils) compared to healthy individuals, which seems to be an effect of FP, as it is mostly evident in individuals with severe tumours. This further supports the hypothesis of the herpesvirus as a causative agent. Immunosuppression is strongly correlated with FP, but does seem to be a consequence of the development and growth of FP rather than a prerequisite, which is similar to other virus-induced tumour diseases in other species, such as Marek's disease in poultry.

== Treatment ==
Surgical removal of tumors caused by FP is the most common treatment method. Photodynamic therapy and electrochemotherapy are also used, as is CO_{2} laser surgery.

== Epidemiology ==
FP affects green sea turtle populations all over the world, making it a panzootic. It is especially found in warmer climates, such as the Caribbean, Hawaii, Japan, and Australia, where up to 70% of individuals in a population have FP.

Epidemiological links are seen between FP rates, nitrogen footprints, and invasive macroalgae. The strongest association with FP is with habitat type, especially increased anthropogenic activity causing high-nitrogen footprints in a surrounding environment where green sea turtles are found. Sea turtles do live in very complex ecosystems, with both near-shore habitats and several years in the open ocean, which makes study of ecosystem associations difficult. Even so, observations support the hypothesis that near-shore habitats have a strong correlation with the disease, as newly recruited individuals from the pelagic life phase have never been found with tumours, and when migrating to more shallow ocean zones, such as the neritic zone, individuals still remain free from FP, but when entering lagoon systems, turtles may become infected. The high prevalence of FP is also associated with habitats’ poor quality, while FP is absent in some habitats of good quality.

Turtles are known to be robust to physical damage, but are surprisingly very susceptible to biological and chemical contaminants caused by anthropogenic activity. As the turtles forage on invasive macroalgae in nutrient-rich waters, they can ingest environmental nitrogen in the form of arginine, which is known to regulate immune activity, promote herpesviruses, and contribute to tumorigenesis.

== See also ==
- Sea turtle tornovirus 1
