= Varicellovirus =

Virus classification
- (unranked): Virus
- Realm: Duplodnaviria
- Kingdom: Heunggongvirae
- Phylum: Peploviricota
- Class: Herviviricetes
- Order: Herpesvirales
- Family: Orthoherpesviridae
- Subfamily: Alphaherpesvirinae
- Genus: Varicellovirus

Species
- See text

Genus of viruses

Varicellovirus (var′i-sel′ō-vi′rŭs) is a genus of viruses belonging to subfamily Alphaherpesvirinae, a member of family Orthoherpesviridae. Humans and other mammals serve as natural hosts. Diseases associated with this genus include: HHV-3—chickenpox (varicella) and shingles; BoHV-1—infectious bovine rhinotracheitis/infectious pustular vulvovaginitis (IPV); and SuHV-1 (also known as pseudorabies virus)—Aujesky's disease.

== Species ==
The genus contains the following species, listed by scientific name and followed by the common name of the species:

- Varicellovirus bovinealpha1, Bovine herpesvirus 1
- Varicellovirus bovinealpha5, Bovine herpesvirus 5
- Varicellovirus bubalinealpha1, Bubaline herpesvirus 1
- Varicellovirus canidalpha1, Canine herpesvirus
- Varicellovirus caprinealpha1, Caprine herpesvirus 1
- Varicellovirus cercopithecinealpha9, Simian varicella virus
- Varicellovirus cervidalpha1, Cervid herpesvirus 1
- Varicellovirus cervidalpha2, Cervid herpesvirus 2
- Varicellovirus cervidalpha3, Cervid herpesvirus 3
- Varicellovirus equidalpha1, Equine herpesvirus 1
- Varicellovirus equidalpha3, Equine herpesvirus 3
- Varicellovirus equidalpha4, Equine herpesvirus 4
- Varicellovirus equidalpha6, Equine herpesvirus 6
- Varicellovirus equidalpha8, Equine herpesvirus 8
- Varicellovirus equidalpha9, Equine herpesvirus 9
- Varicellovirus felidalpha1, Feline herpesvirus 1
- Varicellovirus humanalpha3, Varicella zoster virus
- Varicellovirus monodontidalpha1, Monodontid alphaherpesvirus 1
- Varicellovirus phocidalpha1, Phocid herpesvirus 1
- Varicellovirus suidalpha1, Pseudorabies virus

== Structure ==
As with other alphaherpesviruses, the virus particle has a layered structure: Virions consist of an envelope, a tegument, a nucleocapsid, and a core. Tegument is disordered; they do not display a structure and proteins in variable amounts are arranged sometimes in an asymmetric layer located between envelope and capsid. The viral capsid is contained within a spherical envelope which is 120–200 nm in diameter. Surface projections on envelope (viral receptors) are densely dispersed and contain small spikes that evenly dot the surface.

The capsid/nucleocapsid is round with triangulation number T=16 and exhibits icosahedral symmetry. The capsid is isometric and has a diameter of 100–110 nm. The capsid consists of 162 capsomer proteins with a hexagonal base and a hole running halfway down the long axis. The core consists of a fibrillar spool on which the DNA is wrapped. The end of the fibers are anchored to the underside of the capsid shell. It is a double-stranded enveloped DNA virus

Genus	Structure	Symmetry	Capsid	Genomic arrangement	Genomic segmentation
Varicellovirus	Spherical Pleomorphic	T=16	Enveloped	Linear	Monopartite

== Life cycle ==
Viral replication is nuclear, and is lysogenic. Entry into the host cell is achieved by attachment of the viral glycoproteins to host receptors, which mediates endocytosis. Replication follows the dsDNA bidirectional replication model. DNA-templated transcription, with some alternative splicing mechanism is the method of transcription. The virus exits the host cell by nuclear egress, and budding. Humans and mammals serve as the natural host. Only one member of the Varicellovirus genus, Varicella zoster virus (HHV-3) infects Homo sapiens (humans).

Genus	Host details	Tissue tropism	Entry details	Release details	Replication site	Assembly site	Transmission
Varicellovirus	Mammals	Epithelial mucosa	Glycoprotiens	Budding	Nucleus	Nucleus	Aerosol
