= Equine herpesvirus 3 =

Virus classification
- (unranked): Virus
- Realm: Duplodnaviria
- Kingdom: Heunggongvirae
- Phylum: Peploviricota
- Class: Herviviricetes
- Order: Herpesvirales
- Family: Orthoherpesviridae
- Genus: Varicellovirus
- Species: Varicellovirus equidalpha3

Synonyms
- Equid alphaherpesvirus 3; Equid herpesvirus 3; Equine herpesvirus 3

Species of virus

Equine herpesvirus 3 (EHV-3) is a virus of the family Orthoherpesviridae that affects horses.

== Pathology ==
EHV-3 causes a disease known as equine coital exanthema. The disease is spread through direct and sexual contact, contaminated handlers and equipment, and possibly through flies carrying infected vaginal discharge. EHV-3 has an incubation period of as little as two days. Signs of the disease include often painful pustules and ulcerations of the vagina, penis, prepuce, and perineum. Lesions may also be seen on the lips and teats. Usually the only symptom seen is a decreased libido in stallions. The lesions heal within two weeks. As with other herpes viruses, the virus remains latent in the host for life. Carrier animals can sometimes be identified by spots of pigment loss on dark skin in the genital region.

EHV-3 is best prevented by taking note of present clinical signs and keeping infected horses isolated and breeding stock from sexual contact with other horses. Keep the wounds clean by rinsing with clean water or saline. Antibiotic ointments should not be used on the lesions, because they are caused by a virus, and viruses are not sensitive to antibiotics. Rinsing is enough to keep the numbers of bacteria down. It is important to always maintain good hand hygiene before and after touching the genital area in all horses, and clean instruments, as the virus can be spread by contaminated hands or equipment. Disinfect equipment and stalls that has been used for horses with clinical signs.
