= Taylorella equigenitalis =

Scientific classification
- Domain: Bacteria
- Kingdom: Pseudomonadati
- Phylum: Pseudomonadota
- Class: Betaproteobacteria
- Order: Burkholderiales
- Family: Alcaligenaceae
- Genus: Taylorella
- Species: T. equigenitalis

Binomial name
- Taylorella equigenitalis (Taylor et al. 1983) Sugimoto et al. 1984

Species of bacterium

Taylorella equigenitalis is a Gram-negative, non-motile, microaerophilic bacterium of the genus Taylorella, and the causative agent of contagious equine metritis (CEM) in horses. Phylogeny of T. equigenitalis includes being part of the Alcaligenaceae family.

Taylorella equigenitalis's distribution and habitat are primarily in the urethral fossa, distal urethra, prepuce, free-part of the penis of stallions and the clitoral fossa or sinus of mares. Canada and the USA are T. equigenitalis free, compared to other countries like those in Europe. Infected stallions are asymptomatic and act as the principal source of infection for mares during mating, and their carrier status may persist for many months or even years. A mare that becomes infected normally has recognizable signs unless asymptomatic, contributing to the spread of disease. A symptomatic mare can be identified by the mucus and pus being expelled from her vagina; CEM mares experience an inflamed endometrium causing low fertility and if pregnant a high probability for abortion in the first trimester.

Diagnosis, treatment and prevention of the disease are crucial to managing T. equigenitalis. Diagnosis is best done on chocolate agar or by polymerase chain reaction (PCR) with a sample from the urethral or clitoral fossa. Treatment includes disinfecting the external genital areas with 4% chlorhexidine as well as starting an antibiotic such as ampicillin. Prevention involves testing of new horses brought into the breeding herd, as well as isolation of horses entering T. equigenitalis free countries. Taylorella equigenitalis can have detrimental effects on the equine industry both clinically and economically due to the infertility it causes and the impact on import and export of equine genetics.

== Phylogeny ==
The first identification of Taylorella equigenitalis was by Taylor et al., in 1978 and was referred to at the time as Haemophilus equigenitalis. Due to specific genomic characteristics and DNA hybridization results, Sugimoto et al., proposed the change from Haemophilus genus to Taylorella in 1983. There are two identified species of Taylorella equigenitalis, one of which is resistant to streptomycin. Taylorella equigenitalis is an infectious organism for horses and Taylorella asinigenitalis has been isolated from the genital tracts of male donkeys. Gross morphology and growth rates of T. equigenitalis and T. asinigenitalis are too similar to differentiate the two species without the use of molecular identification techniques such as PCR. Molecular evaluation of the 16S rDNA sequence has confirmed that there is enough of a genetic difference between Taylorella equigenitalis and Taylorella asinigenitalis to separately classify the two species. Taylorella asinigenitalis does not appear to cause disease in equine mares, only in donkeys. Taylorella equigenitalis was previously identified as belonging to the Pasteurellacae family. It is now classified as belonging to the Alcaligenaceae family.

== Morphology ==
Taylorella equigenitalis is a Gram-negative bacterium, which grows best under specific environmental conditions on the reproductive organs, and in the reproductive tract of horses. Taylorella equigenitalis is morphologically identified as coccobacillary or bacillus. Members of the genus Taylorella including T. equigenitalis are non-motile and microaerophilic. Herbert et al., have reported that T. equigenitalis have a capsule and express pili in vivo. Taylorella equigenitalis is pleomorphic on isolation from equine carriers, and there is no formation of endospores. Taylorella equigenitalis has scant growth on blood agar, the best growth is observed on chocolate agar at temperatures between 30 and 42 degrees Celsius. Taylorella equigenitalis tests positive on oxidase, catalase, phosphatase and phosphoamidase reactions and negatively on glucosidase, indole, hydrogen sulfide and production of chemoorganotrophic acid from carbohydrates. T. equigenitalis is sensitive to penicillin type antibiotics.

== Ecology, distribution, and habitat ==
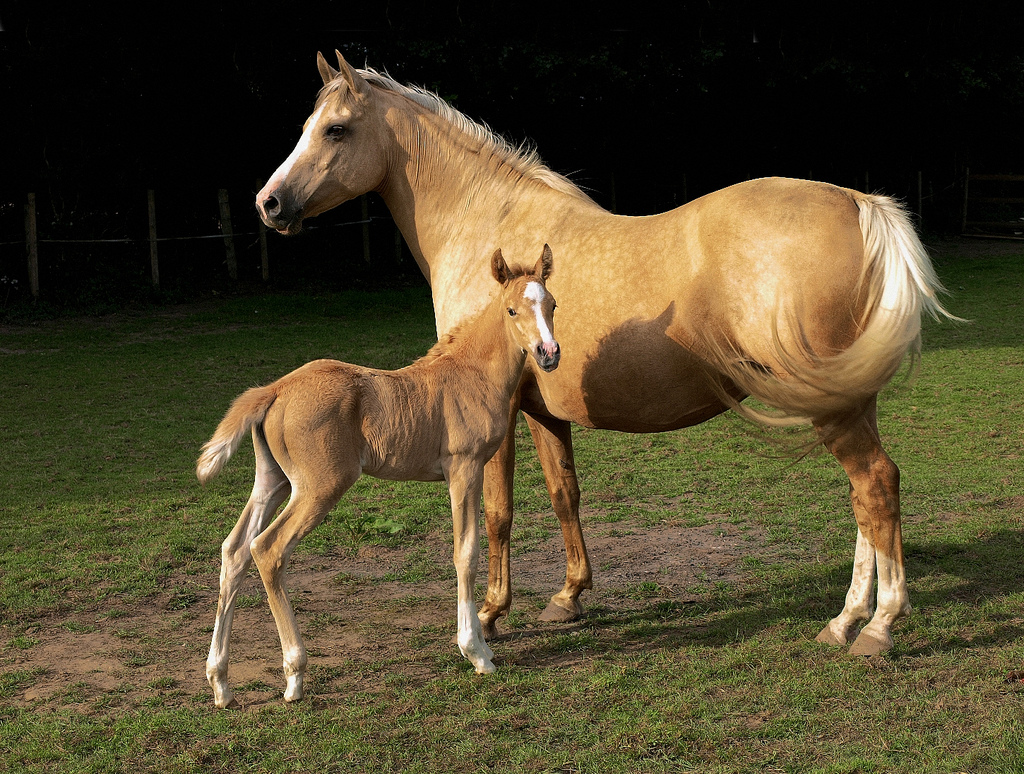
Infertility and abortions are a major concern in mares diagnosed with Taylorella equigenitalis. In contrast, stallions tend to be asymptomatic carriers and do not have clinical signs.

Taylorella equigenitalis is a venereally transmitted disease of horses. Experimental reports have noted intrauterine infection of rodents with Taylorella equigenitalis, but not with cattle, sheep, swine or cats. Taylorella equigenitalis can be isolated from the urethral fossa, distal urethra, prepuce, free-part of the penis and uncommonly from the pre-ejaculatory fluid. In mares, the bacteria is best found in the clitoral fossa and sinus. In stallions, the bacteria is best found in the urethral fossa, urethral sinus, urethral and penile sheath, epididymis and seminal vesicles. On the external genitalia of horses, T. equigenitalis is found particularly in the presence of smegma and cellular debris.

Taylorella equigenitalis was first reported in thoroughbreds in 1977 in the United Kingdom. Transmission occurred following the first report in the UK to Ireland, France, Australia, Belgium, USA, and Germany. Taylorella equigenitalis has been identified throughout the world including in Japan, Australia, North America, South America and Europe. The first isolation of T. equigenitalis in Japan occurred in 1980. The first report of T. equigenitalis in Turkey was reported in 2001. As of 2006, Samper & Tibary reported that T. equigenitalis was no longer present in North America, but is endemic within Europe. The most recent outbreak in the USA reported by Schulman et al., was in 2008-2010 and also in South Africa in 2011. There is thought to be underreporting of T. equigenitalis and that the global distribution of the disease is greater than what is currently reported. Bacteriological and serological screening of horses coming from a country with CEM is required for horses entering countries where CEM is not yet reported. Carriers of T. equigenitalis are the most significant contributor to global spread of CEM in mares and stallions. Taylorella equigenitalis can persist on equine genitalia for years and still be transmitted to susceptible mares or stallions through natural service or artificial insemination. Mares may be asymptomatic harbouring T. equigenitalis in the clitoral sinuses and fossa, it may also remain for months to years in the uterine or clitoral tissue of previously infected mares. More significantly, stallions are frequently asymptomatic when carriers, with T. equigenitalis harbouring in the urethral fossa, urethra or penile sheath.

Vertical transmission from mother to fetus through the placenta has been reported. In particular, colts transplacentally infected while in-utero may become a source of future T. equigenitalis transmission to susceptible mares.

Biosecurity standards including good hygiene, cleaning of fomites and use or sterile and disposable materials should be considered when handling horses for breeding and semen collection. Taylorella equigenitalis does not survive long off of horse reproductive tissue and is sensitive to disinfectants, UV light, high temperatures and humidity.

== Genomics, molecular biology, and biochemical identification ==
The causative agent of CEM is the genome sequence of T. equigenitalis strain MCE9. The genomic structure of T. equigenitalis strain MCE9 contains one chromosome consisting of 1,695,860 base pairs and with a G+C content of approximately 37.42%, with no plasmids. The genome contains 1,556 protein-coding genes, each with an average length of 1,007 base pairs. 1,231 of these protein-coding genes had assigned predicted function. For all amino acids in the sequence there are 38tRNA genes, and three copies of the 16S-23S-5S rRNA operon, three putative transposes genes, and four putative phage-related genes.

Biochemical identification of T. equigenitalis is difficult due to its phenotypic similarity to Taylorella asinigenitalis. The preferred method of differentiation is to examine the serological specificities of T. equigenitalis lipopolysaccharides by performing Sodium dodecyl sulfate-polyacrylamide gel electrophoresis (SDS-PAGE) and silver staining. Lipopolysaccharides typically have 3 regions which include lipid A, core oligosaccharide, and O-polysaccharide (O-PS). Structural analysis research has shown the core oligosaccharide region of T. equigenitalis and T. asinigenitalis are similar and hard to differentiate, while the O-PS region differ in regard to their linear, unbranched disaccharide chains. Therefore, reliable biochemical identification of T. equigenitalis can be assessed by examining its O-PS regions.

== Pathogenesis ==
=== Role in disease ===
A complete understanding behind the pathogenesis of Taylorella equigenitalis has yet to be discovered. The bacterium is known to be a key factor in the development of contagious equine metritis (CEM); however, the virulence factors that contribute to the disease are poorly understood and continuously reviewed.

The incubation period of Taylorella equigenitalis is 2 to 14 days; if infectious, clinical signs are most notable at, or just before 2 weeks after the introduction of T. equigenitalis into the genitalia. Taylorella equigenitalis untreated will invade the endometrial lining and cause edematous, suppurative endometritis characterized by a hyperemic cervix, which may consist of a mucopurulent exudate.

Strains vary in their genomics; various studies have isolated T. equigenitalis from healthy subclinical horses indicating that not all strains are pathogenic and, or that other factors must be present for development of CEM in horses. Pathogenic strains are better equipped to invade the host cells and replicate causing lesions characteristic of CEM, mechanisms which need further investigation.

Research has taken a closer look at some conserved protein regions in the genome to gain a better understanding of their role in the pathogenesis of T. equigenitalis and how the bacterium is able to manifest into a clinically significant disease, CEM. There are highly conserved protein regions thought to encode secretion systems that might be associated to virulence ability (Fic and other unidentified proteins) and structures needed for adhesion (fimbrial low molecular weight proteins and other unidentified proteins). Type VI and possibly Type III secretion system may aid with virulence, toxin secretion, survival, and ability to co-exist with other bacterium present in a polymicrobial infection. Fimbrial low molecular weight proteins (flp pili) were reported in strains with varying pathogenicity. Flp pili aid in adherence to epithelial cell cilia of the genital mucosal, which allows T. equigenitalis to quickly establish residence in that host. Although there are proteins being identified in conserved and variable regions that may contribute to the varying pathogenicity of strains, the true mechanism and their relatedness to virulence is still under investigation.

=== Transmission ===
Taylorella equigenitalis is a sexually transmitted disease more frequently transferred from an infected stallion to a mare through natural mating where coitus involves close physical contact of infected tissues and fluids increasing the risk of transmission; infected mares are also known to transmit the disease to stallions. Artificial insemination with semen collected from an infected stallion is a contributing source of infection. However, AI has a lower incidence report, especially if antibiotics are incorporated during the insemination. Vertical transmission from mother to fetus through the placenta has also been reported. In particular, colts infected in utero via a transplacental route may become a source of future T. equigenitalis transmission to susceptible mares.

Environmental resistance of T.equigenitalis is poor. There is evidence supporting that T. equigenitalis can survive for short periods on fomites contaminated with reproductive tissues and, or fluids; therefore, fomites are still a potential source of transmission for T. equigenitalis and decontamination of these fomites should be performed with care.

=== Host range and zoonotic potential ===
Taylorella equigenitalis are host specific, only establishing a residence in horses, unlike Taylorella asinigenitalis which use donkeys as their natural host. T. equigenitalis has been isolated from other infected species (donkeys and rodents), but only during experimental conditions after they were inoculated. No clinical signs that were indicative of infection developed in trials where cattle, sheep, pigs, and cats were inoculated.

Zoonotic potential is non-existent in any recent literature; therefore, there is no clinical significance for humans, only economic burdens.

== Diagnosis ==
The clinical signs associated with Taylorella equigenitalis infections in mares include abnormally cloudy vaginal or cervical discharge, vulvar inflammation, increased size and hardness of the ovaries and uterus upon rectal palpation, as well as abnormalities in the length and/or stages of the mare's estrous cycle. These signalments are extremely similar to other bacterium which cause infections of the equine reproductive tract, and so diagnosis of T. equigenitalis cannot be based solely on clinical signs. As such, diagnosis of CEM is achieved by PCR or culturing the organism from urethral fossa, urethra, and/or semen of stallions, and the clitoral sinus and central clitoral fossa of mares. One or two swabs from smegma of clitorial sinuses and/or fossae are taken and transferred in AMIES transport medium with charcoal at 4 °C to a laboratory. T. equigenitalis is best isolated on tryptose chocolate blood agar under microaerophilic conditions. The colonies on the chocolate agar appear small, round and raised as well as yellow to grey in colour. Catalase, cytochrome oxidase, and phosphatase biochemical tests will all react positive if inoculated with T. equigenitalis. The volume of the sample on the swab is not relevant, as even a low volume of smegma may harbor this pathogen. The need for a PCR-based test arose from the microaerophilic and slow-growing nature of the bacterium, both of which makes T. equigenitalis difficult to transport in a viable manner, as well as difficult to grow pure isolates rapidly. The PCR test allows for equal sensitivity to that of culture-based diagnosis, but gives more rapid results.

== Treatment ==
Infections of Taylorella equigenitalis can be managed and cleared by disinfectants and antibiotics, both administered topically. Antibiotics useful in treating T. equigenitalis include ampicillin, benzylpenicillin, erythromycin, tetracyclines, gentamicin, and tobramycin. However, some strains of T. equigenitalis have been shown to display streptomycin, sulfamethoxazole and clindamycin resistance and should therefore be avoided. Daily washing of the external genitalia with a solution of 4% chlorhexidine, followed by application of nitrofurazone antibiotic ointment has been stated to be an effective treatment option for stallions and colts. Removal of smegma from the urethral fossa and sinus of the stallions and colts, and from the clitoral sinuses of mares is also vital in the treatment plan. These treatment protocols should be completed once daily over the course of five days for the stallions, or in regards to the mares, over the course of a few weeks. Treatment times can vary in the mares depending on the extent of the disease. Ten days post treatment, the stallion should be retested before he is brought back into the breeding herd.

=== Prevention ===
Prevention is key in avoiding Taylorella equigenitalis outbreaks. Stallions and mares require a certificate before import into the United States of America and Canada stating they are T. equigenitalis negative. Upon entry into North America, each horse must undergo quarantine and additional testing. Testing, physical exams, and sample collections must be completed by an accredited veterinarian upon quarantine. Contagious Equine Metritis as a reportable disease in Canada. This title means that heightened preventative measures are taken to ensure that T. equigenitalis does not enter Canada. If a breeding-age horse is to be imported into Canada, it must first be tested for the presence of CEM, then quarantined, if the horse originates from a country where CEM is prevalent. In endemic areas, environmental hygiene and restrictive breeding programs are effective in preventing transmission from fomites and asymptomatic stallion carriers, respectively. There is currently no effective vaccine against T. equigenitalis.

== Clinical and economic value ==
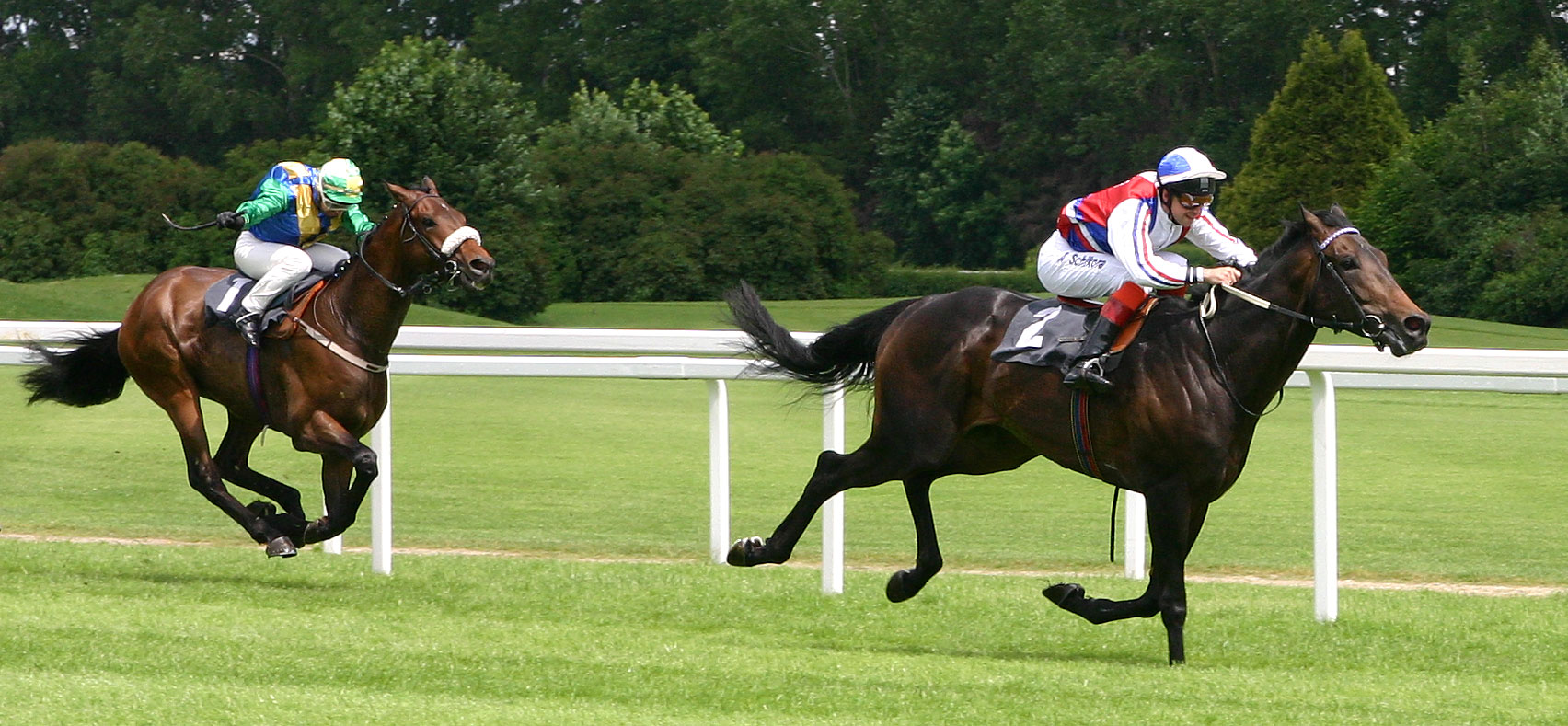
Thoroughbreds in the horseracing industry are a cause of concern for Taylorella equigenitalis outbreaks as seen in the 1977 outbreak in Kentucky.

Due to the possibility of asymptomatic carriers of Taylorella equigenitalis leading to CEM, the economic impact can be substantial. CEM is a reportable disease in Canada to the Canadian Food Inspection Agency (CFIA) and in the United States of America to the United States Department of Agriculture (USDA). It is important to target the asymptomatic carriers to limit the clinical impact, as well as the economical impact. This disease caused by T. equigenitalis is a concern in the equine industry, especially the professional industries of the Thoroughbreds and American Quarter Horses. Following the 1977 outbreak, the cost of the T. equigenitalis to the Kentucky Thoroughbred industry was US$4 million. Although the prognosis following treatment of T. equigenitalis is relatively good, infertility can occur leading to economic losses for the owner; therefore, exact economic losses vary by individual. Treatment, isolation protocols, and investigation of potential outbreaks are costly for the industry. Overall, an outbreak of T. equigenitalis can cost upwards of millions of dollars in lost revenue from semen and embryos, as well as import and export limitations.
