= Taylorella asinigenitalis =

Scientific classification
- Domain: Bacteria
- Kingdom: Pseudomonadati
- Phylum: Pseudomonadota
- Class: Betaproteobacteria
- Order: Burkholderiales
- Family: Alcaligenaceae
- Genus: Taylorella
- Species: T. asinigenitalis

Binomial name
- Taylorella asinigenitalis Sugimoto et al. 1984

Type strain
- ATCC 700933, CIP 107673, LMG 19572, UCD1

Species of bacterium

Taylorella asinigenitalis is a Gram-negative, catalase- and oxidase-positive, nonmotile bacterium of the genus Taylorella, isolated from the genital tract of male donkeys (Equus asinus) in California.
