= Contagious equine metritis =

Medical condition in horses

Contagious equine metritis (CEM) is a type of metritis (uterine inflammation) in horses that is caused by a sexually transmitted infection. It is thus an equine venereal disease of the genital tract of horses, brought on by the Taylorella equigenitalis bacteria and spread through sexual contact. The disease was first reported in 1977, and has since been reported worldwide.

== Signs ==
Signs in mares appear ten to fourteen days after breeding to an infected or carrier stallion. A gray to creamy vulvar discharge mats the hair of the buttocks and tail, although in many cases, the discharge is absent and the infection is not apparent. Most mares recover spontaneously, although many become carriers. Infected mares are usually infertile during the acute illness. However, the infertility only lasts a few weeks, after which pregnancy is possible.

Stallions do not show signs of infection. The first indication of the carrier state is lack of pregnancy in the mares covered by the stallion.

== Diagnosis ==
Diagnosis is made by taking samples for bacterial culture from all accessible sites. In mares, this includes the endometrium, cervix, clitoral fossa and sinuses. In stallions, samples are taken from the skin folds of the prepuce, urethral fossa, urethra, and the pre-ejaculatory fluid. Samples are refrigerated and transported to an approved testing laboratory within 48 hours of collection.

Blood tests for mares are available for detecting antibodies to Taylorella equigenitalis. Blood tests are not possible for stallions. These tests become positive 10 or more days after infection. If positive, they only indicate that the mare has had the disease in the past, and do not indicate whether the mare is a carrier now.

== Treatment ==
Taylorella equigenitalis is susceptible to most antibiotics, although the carrier state in mares is difficult to eliminate. Most mares with acute endometritis recover spontaneously. Recommended therapy is to infuse the uterus with an antibiotic such as penicillin, cleansing the clitoral area with 2% chlorhexidine solution and then applying chlorhexidine or nitrofurazone ointment to the clitoral fossa and sinuses. The entire treatment is repeated daily for five days.

It is relatively easy to eliminate the carrier state in stallions using local disinfectant. With the stallion's penis dropped and the glans extended from the foreskin, the shaft of the penis, including the folds of the prepuce and the urethral fossa, should be cleansed daily for five days with a 2% chlorhexidine solution. After drying, nitrofurazone cream is applied to these areas.

== History ==
The disease was first reported in 1977 on horse breeding farms in England, when an unusually high proportion of mares were not becoming pregnant. CEM was also officially confirmed in Ireland and Australia in 1977. It was found in United States in 1978 in horses imported to Kentucky from Europe. A second American outbreak occurred a year later in Missouri but in both cases, the diseases were quickly eradicated. In 2008, a Quarter Horse stallion standing at stud in Kentucky was found to be carrying Taylorella equigenitalis; an investigation of this case revealed infections in eight other US states, in eleven different breeds of horse.
