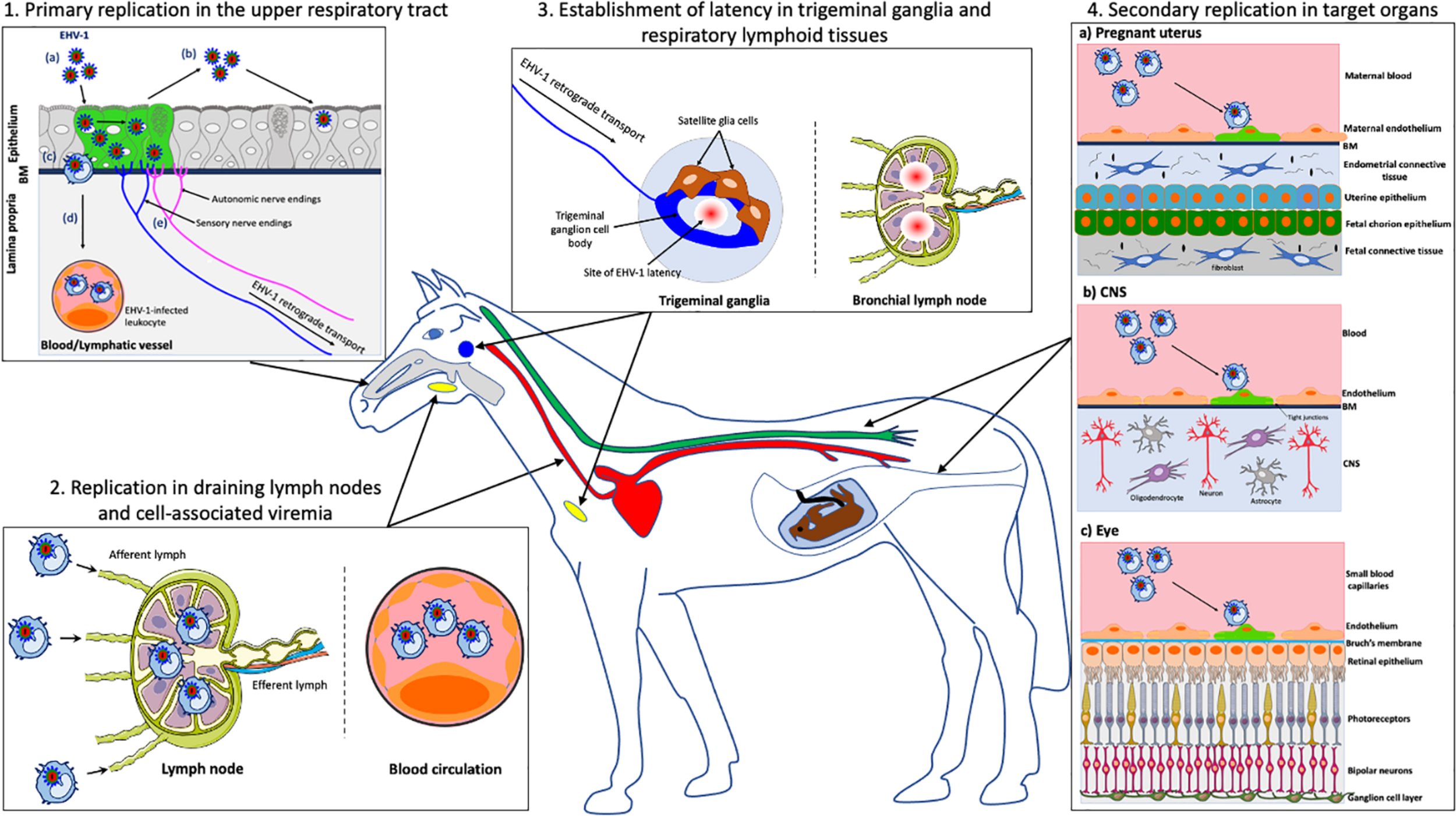

Virus classification
- (unranked): Virus
- Realm: Duplodnaviria
- Kingdom: Heunggongvirae
- Phylum: Peploviricota
- Class: Herviviricetes
- Order: Herpesvirales
- Family: Orthoherpesviridae
- Genus: Varicellovirus
- Species: Varicellovirus equidalpha1

Synonyms
- Equid alphaherpesvirus 1; Equid herpesvirus 1; Equine herpesvirus 1

= Equine herpesvirus 1 =

Species of virus

Equine herpesvirus 1 (EHV-1) is a virus of the family Orthoherpesviridae that causes abortion, respiratory disease and occasionally neonatal mortality in horses. Initial spread of EHV-1 by a newly introduced horse through direct and indirect contact can lead to abortion and perinatal infection in up to 70 percent of a previously unexposed herd. Abortion usually occurs in the last four months of gestation, two to four weeks after infection of the mare. Perinatal (around the time of birth) infection can lead to pneumonia and death. Encephalitis can occur in affected animals, leading to ataxia, paralysis, and death. The virus varies in severity from sub-clinical to very severe. Most horses have been infected with EHV-1, but the virus can become latent and persist without ever causing signs of infection. In 2006, an outbreak of EHV-1 among stables in Florida resulted in the institution of quarantine measures. The outbreak was determined to have originated in horses imported from Europe via New York, before being shipped to Florida.

== Strains ==
Two main strains of EHV-1 have been isolated. D752 strains are correlated to outbreaks associated with neurological disease, whereas outbreaks with non-neurological disease are more closely associated with strains of N752. However, not all horses infected with D752 strains develop neurological disease; conversely, some horses infected with N752 strains will develop neurological disease. A mutation results in both these two different main strains, D752 is the presence of aspartic acid and the N752 is the presence of asparagine. 80–90% of neurological disease is caused by the D752, and 10–20% for N752. The disease caused by neurological strains has been named Equine Herpesvirus Myeloencephalopathy or EHM. There is currently no licensed vaccine against EHM and no treatment other than palliative care. The disease rose to worldwide public prominence in early 2011, due to an outbreak centered on the National Cutting Horse Association (NCHA) Western National Championships held in Ogden, Utah, from April 29 to May 8, 2011. The outbreak lasted approximately two months, generating 90 confirmed cases of the disease, spread over 10 American states, and resulting in the deaths of 13 horses before it was declared contained by the US Department of Agriculture.

=== Latency ===
The EHV-1 virus can latently infect horses and can reactivate if appropriate conditions appear. These conditions include high levels of stress, immunosuppression, transportation, sale barns, competitions, geological and management practices. Current studies that have been done are showing that a majority of horses are actually latently infected with EHV-1. The consequence of latency is that in fact, it can cause an outbreak of EHV-1 in a closed group of horses, without any external source. Latent infected horses do not shed EHV-1 through nasal secretions and therefore are not infectious and are called clinically normal.

== Signs, symptoms and transmission ==
The signs that occur with EHV-1 and the EHM strain may include the following: decreased coordination, urine dribbling, fever, hind limb weakness, leaning against things to maintain balance, and lethargy..Some horses may be asymptomatic upon infection increasing the difficulty in controlling the spread of the virus. Due to the nature of the virus being highly contagious, a common reservoir of the virus can include contaminated bedding. Fetuses that may have been aborted and their excrements are the major reservoir for EHV-1 and should be immediately disposed of upon abortion. Although infected horses build some type of immunity through repeated exposure of the virus, there has been no evidence of adaptive immunity to provide protection against the most severe symptoms of EHV-1 including EHM. p.

=== Risk factors ===
Scientists have identified multiple risk factors that increase a horse's susceptibility to EHV-1. The variation in risk factors is due to the numerous EHV-1 strains that may cause infection. Common risk factors seen in all EHV-1 infections include the age, sex, and gender of the horse. Additional risk factors that vary depending on the type of EHV-1 strain present include the following: living quarters (confined or pastured), prevalence of other horses, unsterilized equipment shared between horses, transportation (hauling) and what time of year infection is present (winter or summer). Stabled horses are prone to EHV-1 due to the high stress environments seen in confined living quarters. As seen in other viral infections, older horses are more susceptible to the disease therefore treatment is advised for those that fit this category to prevent EHV-1 infection.

== Diagnosis, treatment and prevention ==
=== Treatment ===
The current diagnosis used for detecting EHV-1 involves PCR which amplifies a segment of DNA from the horse using specific primers that target EHV-1's genetic makeup. To determine whether the reaction amplified a genetic region of interest (ie. primers specific to EHV-1) the PCR result is viewed using UV fluorescence where a determination can be made based on the size of the genetic region amplified; the size of the amplified DNA can be measured by the number of base pairs and compared to the number of base pairs that the EHV-1 primers amplified. A match in base pairs seen in the reaction amplified to the primers used indicates a horse has been infected with EHV-1. Samples acquired from susceptible horses exposed to EHV-1 can be determined from a blood test or nasal swab. Although the PCR test has been a gold standard for many years in determining whether one harbors a certain infection, it is time consuming and there is a chance EHV-1 may not be detected in the DNA sample if the horse is in fact infected. This is common among horses that are latently infected where the virus is not actively replicating and therefore producing multiple copies of its genetic sequence. If a horse is in fact infected with EHV-1, treatment options are limited with the use of anti-inflammatory drugs administered either orally or intravenously. Even then, prognosis of the horse results in treatment that may alleviate EHV-1 symptoms presented (if symptomatic), but cannot be used to eliminate infection as no treatment to date has been found to do so.

=== Prevention ===
Vaccines exist to control the virus but not to prevent it. The inactivated vaccine contain a low antigen load and are made to help protect against the respiratory symptoms, the performance of the inactivated vaccines is variable and does not work for all. The modified live vaccine is made to vaccinate healthy horses 3 months or older, to help prevent the respiratory symptoms caused by EHV-1. Vaccinations should be given in 6-month intervals, and different horses will need to be vaccinated at different times. Pregnant mares should be vaccinated during the fifth, seventh and ninth months of gestation, with the inactivated EHV-1 vaccine. Foals should be vaccinated in a series of 3 doses starting at 3 months in 4–6 week intervals. Even though a horse has been vaccinated, infection and clinical disease still continues to occur. New vaccines to help prevent the spread of the virus are being studied.

To prevent the spread of EHV-1, there are a few steps that should be taken. Most important is to stop horse movement and transportation; not allowing horses that have been exposed to EHV-1 to be in contact with unexposed horses; and to isolate animals that are showing symptoms of the virus. Ideally, horses that are showing symptoms should be completely quarantined. The recommended quarantined period is at least 21 days. Another facet of EHV-1 control is to be aware of the potential for spreading the virus via equipment, and transmission, via human contact, between horses. Since people can and do transfer this virus via their hands and clothing, people need to take sanitary precautions when handling a sick horse. Disinfecting footwear and wearing gloves can help minimize the risk of spreading. Routinely cleaning and disinfecting the barns and buildings where horses have been is important for preventing transmission. In the case of an outbreak, one should also take precautions to minimize stress on the horses. As stated previously, stress will trigger a latent virus to reactivate, and it can allow an uninfected horse to be more easily infected.
