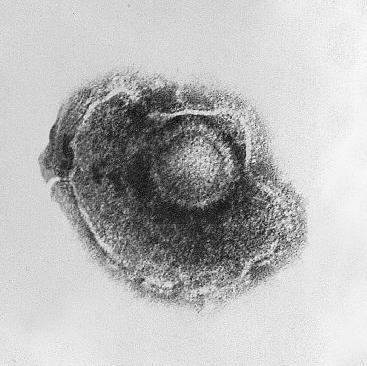
- Electron micrograph of a Human herpesvirus 3 virion

Virus classification
- (unranked): Virus
- Realm: Duplodnaviria
- Kingdom: Heunggongvirae
- Phylum: Peploviricota
- Class: Herviviricetes
- Order: Herpesvirales
- Family: Orthoherpesviridae
- Subfamily: Alphaherpesvirinae

Genera
- See text

= Alphaherpesvirinae =

Subfamily of viruses

Alphaherpesvirinae is a subfamily of viruses in the family Orthoherpesviridae, primarily distinguished by reproducing more quickly than other subfamilies in the Orthoherpesviridae. Mammals serve as natural hosts. The subfamily contains five genera. Diseases associated with this subfamily include: HHV-1 and HHV-2: skin vesicles or mucosal ulcers, rarely encephalitis and meningitis, HHV-3: chickenpox (varicella) and shingles, GaHV-2: Marek's disease. In animals, Pseudorabies virus is the causative agent of Aujeszky's disease in pigs, and Bovine herpesvirus 1 is the causative agent of bovine infectious rhinotracheitis and pustular vulvovaginitis.

== Genera ==
Alphaherpesvirinae consists of the following five genera:

- Iltovirus
- Mardivirus
- Scutavirus
- Simplexvirus
- Varicellovirus

== Structure ==
Viruses in Alphaherpesvirinae are enveloped, with icosahedral, spherical to pleomorphic, and round geometries, and T=16 symmetry. The diameter is around 150-200 nm. Genomes are linear and non-segmented, around 120 to 180 kb in length.

Genus	Structure	Symmetry	Capsid	Genomic arrangement	Genomic segmentation
Iltovirus	Spherical pleomorphic	T=16	Enveloped	Linear	Monopartite
Mardivirus	Spherical pleomorphic	T=16	Enveloped	Linear	Monopartite
Simplexvirus	Spherical pleomorphic	T=16	Enveloped	Linear	Monopartite
Scutavirus	Spherical pleomorphic	T=16	Enveloped	Linear	Monopartite
Varicellovirus	Spherical pleomorphic	T=16	Enveloped	Linear	Monopartite

== Life cycle ==
Viral replication is nuclear and is lysogenic. Entry into the host cell is achieved by attachment of the viral gB, gC, gD and gH proteins to host receptors, which mediates endocytosis. Replication follows the dsDNA bidirectional replication model. DNA-templated transcription, with some alternative splicing mechanism is the method of transcription. Translation takes place by leaky scanning. The virus exits the host cell by nuclear egress, budding, and microtubular outwards viral transport. Mammals serve as the natural host. Transmission routes are sexual, contact, body fluids, lesions, and respiratory.

Genus	Host details	Tissue tropism	Entry details	Release details	Replication site	Assembly site	Transmission
Iltovirus	Birds: galliform: psittacine	None	Cell receptor endocytosis	Budding	Nucleus	Nucleus	Oral-fecal; aerosol
Mardivirus	Chickens; turkeys; quail	None	Cell receptor endocytosis	Budding	Nucleus	Nucleus	Aerosol
Simplexvirus	Humans; mammals	Epithelial mucosa	Cell receptor endocytosis	Budding	Nucleus	Nucleus	Saliva
Scutavirus	Sea turtles	None	Cell receptor endocytosis	Budding	Nucleus	Nucleus	Aerosol
Varicellovirus	Mammals	Epithelial mucosa	Glycoproteins	Budding	Nucleus	Nucleus	Aerosol

== See also ==
- Chelonid alphaherpesvirus 6
