= B virus =

- B virus spread in murine cells with time at 24 and 48-hours post infection (PI)

Virus classification
- (unranked): Virus
- Realm: Duplodnaviria
- Kingdom: Heunggongvirae
- Phylum: Peploviricota
- Class: Herviviricetes
- Order: Herpesvirales
- Family: Orthoherpesviridae
- Genus: Simplexvirus
- Species: Simplexvirus macacinealpha1

Synonyms
- Cercopithecine herpesvirus 1; CHV-1; Herpes virus B; Macacine alphaherpesvirus 1; Macacine herpesvirus 1

Species of virus

B-virus, sometimes called Herpes B, is a virus of the genus Simplexvirus that infects macaque monkeys. B virus is very similar to Herpes simplex virus 1, and as such, this neurotropic virus is not found in the blood.

In the natural host, the virus exhibits pathogenesis similar to that of cold sores in humans. There have been a number of accidental infections and fatalities of researchers working with rhesus monkeys (Rhesus macaque). When humans are zoonotically infected with B virus, they can present with a severe encephalitis, resulting in permanent neurological dysfunction or death. Severity of the disease increases for untreated patients, with a case fatality rate of approximately 80%. Early diagnosis and subsequent treatment are crucial to human survival of the infection.

== History ==
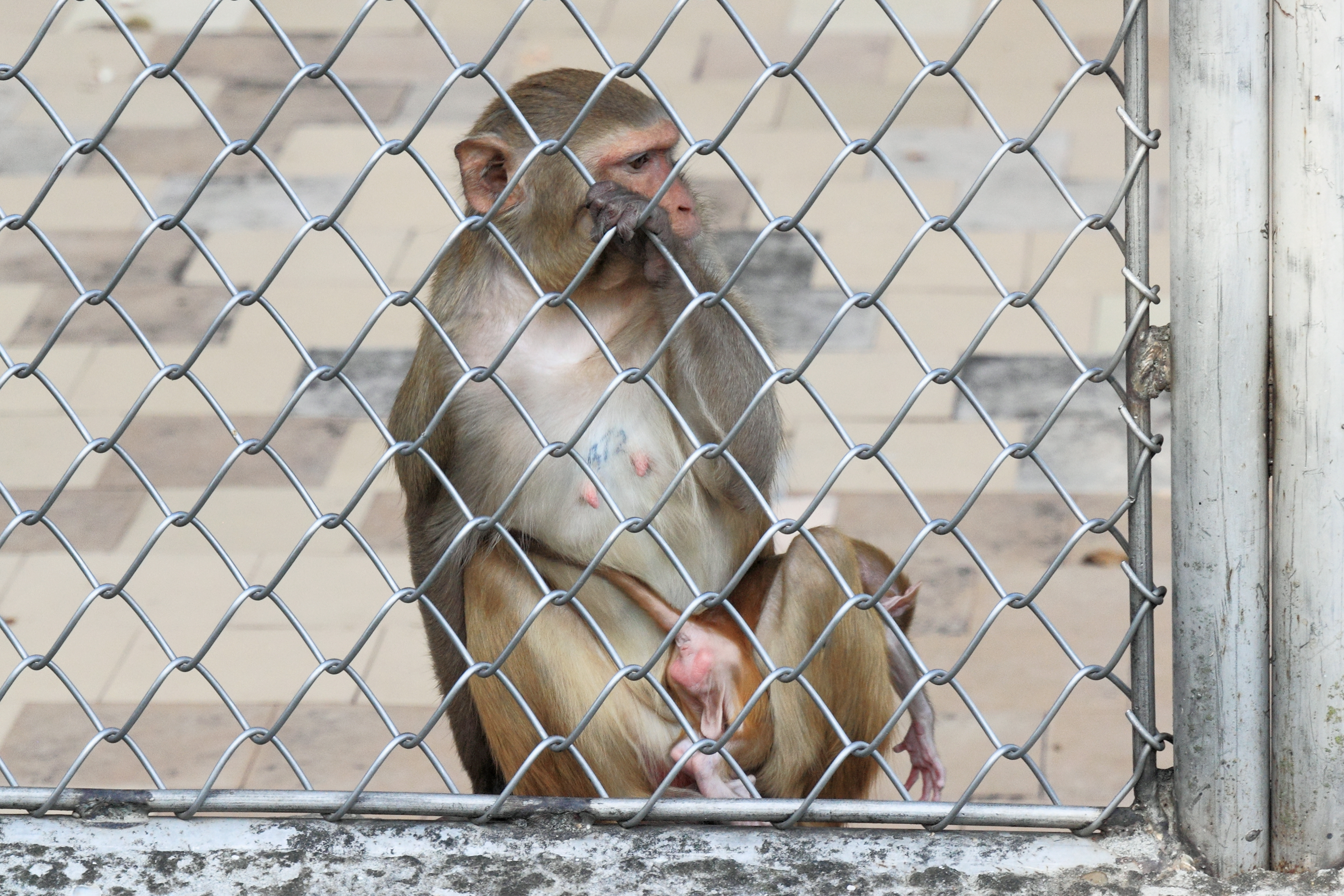
Rhesus monkeys are a natural host of B virus and have on occasion caused fatal infections in researchers

B virus was first discovered in 1932 following the death of William Brebner, a young physician who was bitten by a rhesus monkey while doing research on polio. He had healed from the bite but later developed a febrile illness, resulting in localized erythema, lymphangitis, lymphadenitis and, ultimately, transverse myelitis. Neurologic tissues obtained during autopsy revealed the presence of an ultrafilterable agent that appeared similar to HSV-1. This isolate was originally termed "W virus."

Within a year of Brebner's death, Albert Sabin identified a novel virus from the same samples, which he later named B virus. Sabin further described the lethality of B virus by showing that infectivity was independent of the route of inoculation. Additionally, it was observed that B virus induced immunologic responses similar to HSV-1 and shared similarities to HVP-2 and Langur herpesvirus, two other nonhuman primate alphaherpesviruses.

By 1959, B virus was identified as the causative agent in 17 human cases, 12 of which resulted in death. Approximately 50 cases had been identified by 2002, although only 26 were well documented. Improvements in handling human cases have been made in the past several decades. Between 1987 and 2004, the mortality rate decreased, largely due to the addition of new forms of treatment and improved diagnosis. There have been a total of five fatalities related to B virus in this period.

In 1997 researcher Elizabeth Griffin was splashed in the eye by an infected rhesus monkey while working at the Yerkes National Primate Research Center and subsequently died. In 2019, a researcher working with monkeys at a Japanese pharmaceutical company became infected and critically ill. In 2021, a veterinarian in China became infected while performing two dissections on rhesus monkeys and subsequently died.

== Virology ==
=== Structure ===
B virus is approximately 200 nm in diameter and has a structure almost identical to that of HSV1 and HSV2. It has an icosahedral capsid (T=16) consisting of 150 hexons and 12 pentons formed from 6 proteins. The envelope is loose around the viral capsid and contains at least 10 glycoproteins critical for adsorption and penetration into host cells. The tegument, containing at least 14 proteins, lies between the capsid and the envelope. The tegument proteins are involved in nucleic acid metabolism, DNA synthesis, and protein processing. The proteins in the tegument are thymidine kinase, thymidylate synthetase, dUTPase, ribonucleotide reductase, DNA polymerase, DNA helicase, DNA primase, and protein kinases.

=== Genome ===
The B virus genome was fully sequenced in 2003 from an isolate found in a rhesus macaque. Like all herpes viruses, the B virus genome contains double-stranded DNA and is approximately 157 kbp in length. Two unique regions (UL and US) are flanked by a pair of inverted repeats, two of which are found at the termini, with the other two internally located. This arrangement, which is identical in nature to HSV, results in four sequence-oriented isomers. Cytosine and guanine nucleotides represent 75% of the sequence.

Sequence analyses suggest that B virus and HSV types 1 and 2 most likely diverged from a common ancestor during the evolution of these pathogens. Each gene-encoded glycoprotein, including gB, gC, gD, gE and gG, has approximately 50% homology with HSV, with a slightly higher predilection towards HSV-2 over HSV-1. Additionally, glycoprotein sequences have demonstrated that all cysteine residues are conserved, as are most glycosylation sites. One key difference between the B virus and the HSVs is that B virus does not have a homolog of the HSV γ_{1}34.5 gene, which codes for a neurovirulence factor. This indicates that B virus has different mechanisms from HSV for replicating inside nerve cells, which could explain the drastically different effects of these viruses on humans.

== Infection ==
In the natural host, the virus exhibits pathogenesis similar to that of cold sores in humans.

=== Humans ===
B virus infection of humans is extremely rare. People typically get infected with B virus if they are bitten or scratched by an infected macaque monkey, or have contact with the monkey's eyes, nose, or mouth. Only one case has been documented of an infected person spreading B virus to another person. Traveling to an area where macaques are known carriers of the virus and interacting in close contact in areas such as temples poses a risk of exposure. However, even in endemic areas, human cases are rare. There have been no known cases of B virus in travelers.

When humans are zoonotically infected with B virus, they can develop encephalitis, resulting in permanent neurological dysfunction or death. The severity of the disease increases for untreated patients. As of 2014, there was a case fatality rate of approximately 80%.

As of 2020, there have been 50 documented cases of human B virus infection since the identification of the virus in 1932, 21 of which led to death. At least 20 of the patients developed some degree of encephalitis.

B virus is the only identified non-human primate herpesvirus that displays severe pathogenicity in humans.

== Prevention ==
Personal protective equipment is necessary when working with macaques, especially with animals that have tested positive for the virus. Bites, scratches, and exposures to mucous membranes, including the eye, have led to infection when not cleaned immediately.

== Treatment ==
Early diagnosis and subsequent treatment are crucial to human survival of the infection. Upon potential infection, samples from both the human and, when possible, the macaque should be sent for B virus diagnostic testing.

Acyclovir has prevented progression of the disease in some patients and may be lifesaving, though it is thought to be only one-tenth as effective against B virus as against HSV1. Prompt treatment is essential to prevent permanent neurological impairment.
