= Pacheco's disease =

Virus classification
- (unranked): Virus
- Realm: Duplodnaviria
- Kingdom: Heunggongvirae
- Phylum: Peploviricota
- Class: Herviviricetes
- Order: Herpesvirales
- Family: Orthoherpesviridae
- Genus: Iltovirus
- Species: Iltovirus psittacidalpha1

Synonyms
- Psittacid alphaherpesvirus 1; Herpes hepatosplenitis

Viral disease in parrots

Pacheco's disease is a highly infectious and acute bird disease caused by a species of herpesvirus, Psittacid alphaherpesvirus 1 (PsHV-1). All psittacine species are susceptible to Pacheco's disease, mainly those in zoological collections and aviaries in any geographic regions. Pacheco's disease most commonly occurs in Amazon parrots, followed by African grey parrots, parrots, macaws, cockatoos and conures. Due to a very high mortality rate within these susceptible species, concerns are brought to companion bird markets and breeders.

The main sign of Pacheco's disease is a sudden and rapid death of birds. It is often preceded by short, severe illnesses, which includes diarrhoea, lethargy, anorexia and inactivity. The virus is transmitted between birds through ingestion, by contaminated food or water, as well as through inhalation and conjunctival exposure. The rate that the virus can spread is highly influenced by its environment and living conditions. Birds can then develop signs and symptoms weeks after being in contact with the virus. If a bird survives Pacheco's disease, it may later develop internal papilloma disease in its gastrointestinal tract.

Pacheco's disease is diagnosed through a DNA probe or chemical and serological testings. No vaccine directly cures Pacheco's disease. There are only treatments with acyclovir and formalin-inactivated vaccine that helps prevent the virus from replicating.

The first case of Pacheco's disease occurred in Brazil in 1930. Since then, there have been multiple outbreaks globally including in Europe, Japan, Middle East and the U.S. The main source of these outbreaks is mainly due to the importation of birds. The disease is named after the veterinarian Genésio Pacheco (1890–1973), who first described the disease in 1930 while working at the Biological Institute of São Paulo in Brazil.

== Signs and symptoms ==
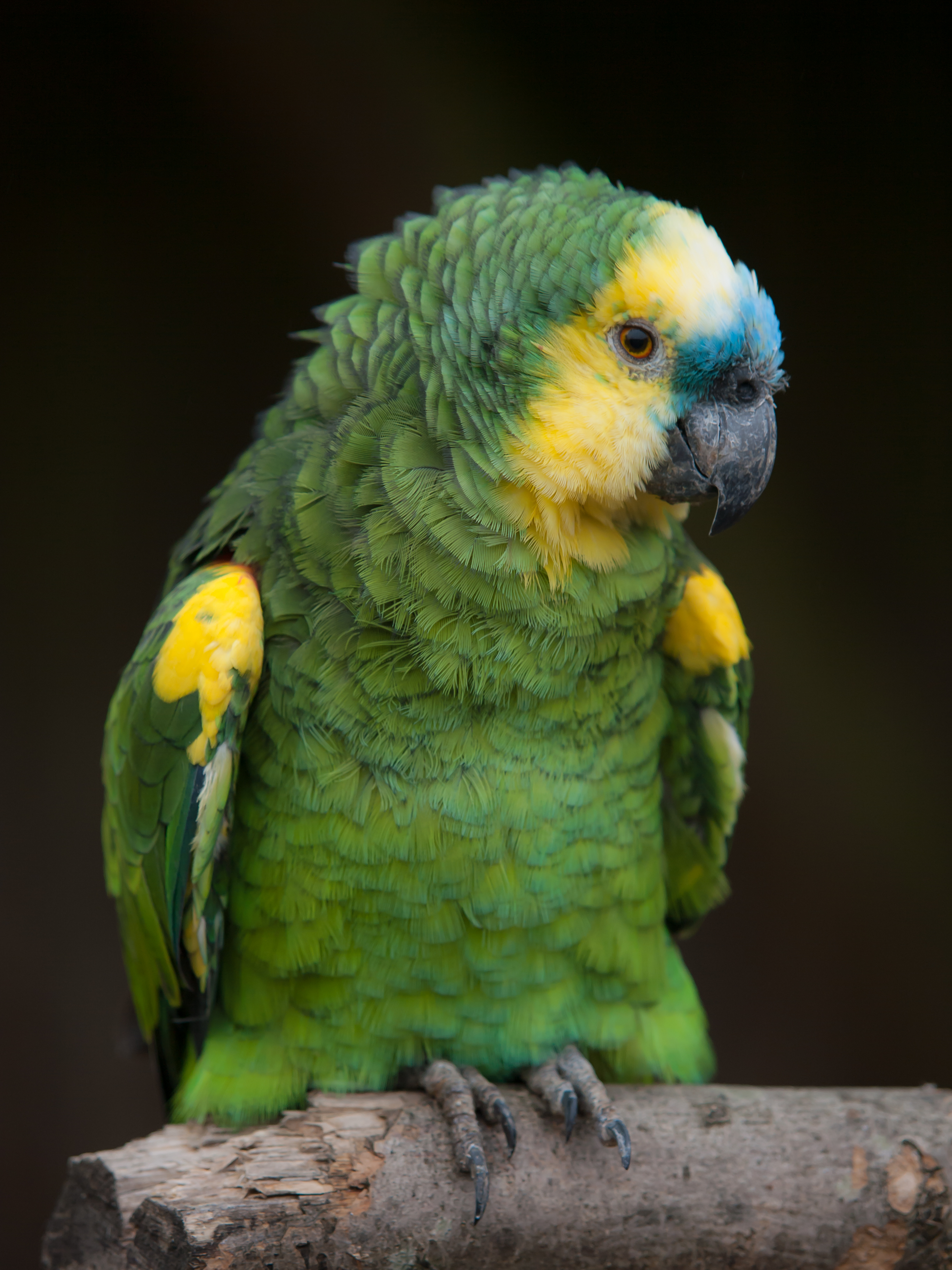
An uninfected blue-fronted Amazon parrot; one of the vulnerable species to carry and transmit Pacheco's disease

Birds infected with Pacheco's disease usually experience minor signs and symptoms that appear right before or after its death. Birds can have a watery, yellowish to greenish discolouration of urates and faeces or have moist droppings. They can experience mucoid discharges from the nostrils, such as in blue-and-gold macaws and Amazon parrots, or a regurgitation of clear sanguineous fluids. As the disease progresses, birds can become difficult to arouse, experience lethargy and somnolence as well as lose interest in eating and its normal daily activities. Birds can also display signs of extreme depression only hours before its death. However, due to the short duration of infection and lack of severe clinical signs indicating a presence of the herpesvirus, birds that experience a rapid death are found in excellent bodily conditions with full crops. Infected birds often do not live long enough for the collection of its blood for testing or diagnoses.

Laboratory tests can also display the abnormalities of tissues, such as a liver with pale yellow to brown patches in necrotic areas. Examinations mainly present lesions in the liver and spleen, such as an enlargement of both organs with diffuse patches of necrosis and the bleeding of broken capillaries (petechial haemorrhage). There can also be minimal to no inflammatory response surrounding the necrotic areas. By comparing these signs and symptoms to a healthy liver that displays no signs of reactions, this indicates a presence of the herpesvirus infection.

External and environmental changes can promote the spread of the disease and increase virulence. Importing birds from a warm to cold environment and stress due to overcrowding can trigger outbreaks of Pacheco's disease.

== Cause ==
The virus Psittacid alphaherpesvirus 1 is the etiologic agent that causes Pacheco's disease. This virus species is closely related to Gallid alphaherpesvirus 1. It was initially identified as a herpesvirus by examining its virion size, sensitivity to ether, the formation of intranuclear inclusions, its ability to thicken the nuclear membranes of the host cells.

Pacheco's disease is caused by at least three different serotypes of the herpesvirus. The most common strain that causes Pacheco's disease is Serotype 1. This is followed by Serotype 2 and less frequently, Serotype 3. In curing Pacheco's disease, the vaccine developed must protect the birds against these main three serotypes.

=== Transmission ===
Although there is no exact route of transmission, Pacheco's disease is not transmissible by humans. It is also not transmissible to other common laboratory animals, including guinea pigs, mice as well as other certain bird species, such as pigeons and canaries. Adult birds that are infected with the herpesvirus causing Pacheco's disease can transmit and infect their parent-fed offspring, who may not develop signs.

Pacheco's disease is usually spread by aerolisation or contact. The main sources of contraction is through the faeces, oral and pharyngeal secretions of carrier birds where the virus has shed, or through contaminated food or water. Once a bird has been infected and recovers from Pacheco's disease, it is permanently immune and becomes a carrier of the disease, whether it displays symptoms or not. Carrier birds are still able to transmit the virus to healthy birds. These latently infected birds then become a potential source for future outbreaks as well as a spread of mucosal papillomas. This makes it essential for all recently imported psittacine birds to be tested for the presence of the herpesvirus before entering a resident of aviaries. Droppings of resident birds are also screened periodically to determine the presence of the virus. Infected birds are quarantined and isolated from the rest of the birds to prevent any further transmissions or deaths.

== Diagnosis ==
Pacheco's disease can be diagnosed both antemortem and post-mortem. By diagnosing an infected bird antemortem, a DNA probe runs serologically and detects the virus within the bird's internal system, mainly to find asymptomatic carriers. This theoretically tests for all known herpesvirus serotypes that infect the birds and involves taking samples from the bird's oral cavity or cloaca, where the virus can be consistently detected in most parrots. However, readings can often present a misleading indication that there is no presence of Pacheco's disease as a result of samples being collected at the time the bird is not shedding the herpesvirus. The detection of the virus through the DNA probe also helps identify a contaminated environment the bird has recently been exposed to.

An indirect immunoperoxidase method is another chemically sensitive and specific testing that laboratories have used to arrive at a reliable result in making a histopathological diagnosis of Pacheco's disease. This test does not require highly complex devices or sources. It detects the presence of the avian alpha-herpesvirus, which is the causative agent, through an antiserum obtained in SPF chickens as well as another serum obtained from rabbit anti-chicken IgG that is conjugated with horseradish peroxidase. By applying this test on post-mortem tissues, dark dispersed spotting on the liver and small intestines in necrotic areas display an indication of a reaction to the viral antigen. This is possible due to the high degree of contrast between the viral antigen and host cell that allows a detection of Pacheco's disease. This approach has successfully confirmed diagnoses in psittacine birds that were previously diagnosed with Pacheco's disease based on its clinical features and macroscopic lesions, indicating its accuracy and reliability.

Serologic testing is another diagnosis method that detects the virus within the birds through antibody tests and overseeing the bird's antibody tiers. This test involves observing the titre levels in paired serum samples. Increasing titres indicate a recent infection while decreasing titres indicate that the antibodies in the immune system is no longer being stimulated. However, these antibody tests are not as helpful in diagnosing birds that are already sick or those birds that do not live long enough to compare titres. A bird infected with Pacheco's disease's virus antibody titre is considered latently infected.

== Treatment ==
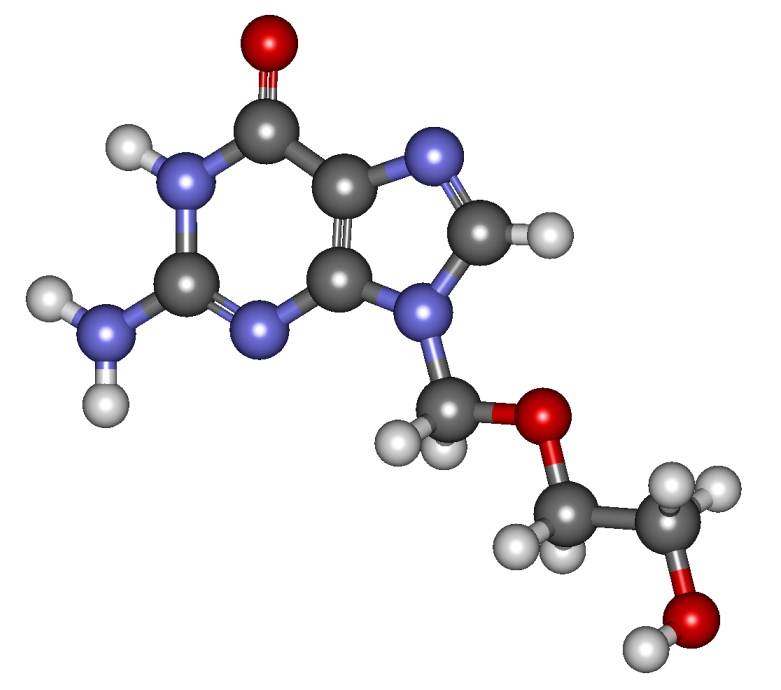
The molecular structure of Acyclovir, an antiviral medication that acts as an inhibitor to reduce the replication rate of the virus within affected birds.

There is no effective vaccine that completely cures Pacheco's disease in infected birds. It is difficult to establish an effective treatment for Pacheco's disease as birds can suddenly die without displaying any symptoms. However, there have been successful uses of acyclovir, an antiviral medication, in reducing high death rates by rapidly inhibiting the virus replication within the birds. Acyclovir is a synthetic acyclic purine nucleoside that has strong activity against certain members of the herpesvirus group. It is given to birds in the form of oral administration for numerous days or in an IV form. Acyclovir has decreased morbidity and mortality during multiple Pacheco's disease outbreaks. However, it cannot prevent the establishment of the carrier and latent infections. This means that acyclovir cannot be used to cure the virus infection and infected birds will remain infected and become a carrier throughout its lifetime.

An autogenous, formalin-inactivated vaccine, with an adjuvant of aluminium, hydroxide gel, has similarly been used in an outbreak, in 1999, to successfully protect psittacine birds from Pacheco's disease. This vaccine was used to stop the rapid spread of the virus and helped maintain morbidity and mortality rates in psittacine birds within the zoo. By injecting this in the birds, it effectively contained the outbreak, where no herpesvirus was isolated from faecal samples of the many psittacine birds after the outbreak occurred.

== Epidemiology ==
The first recognised case of Pacheco's disease occurred in 1930 in Brazil from birds that were imported from South America. It was not until 1933 when the causative agent was identified. Since then, the global spread of Pacheco's disease has increased as a result of domestically raised birds or the transportation of aviaries that contains symptomatic and asymptomatic infected birds.

=== Outbreaks ===
In February 1933, an outbreak occurred in Campania, Italy. A shipment of 93 psittacine birds was imported to Campania, Italy, from Guayana, South America. It contained macaws, Amazon parrots, conures and parakeets, who were all transferred to quarantine premises and were housed in cages, based on its size and genera. All birds arrived in good and healthy conditions and were previously vaccinated against PPD and Poxviridae with a commercial vaccine containing PsiHV1. However, three of the Conure parakeets suddenly died without displaying any relevant symptoms, followed by the rest of its species. While certain species experienced high mortality rates, others had not, such as A. manilata, B. cbyoptems and A. mehnocepbala. In this instance, the vaccine failed to serve its purpose as the vaccine only protected the birds against 1 serotype, rather than all 3 known serotypes that cause Pacheco's disease. This raised concerns about how vaccines relating to Pacheco's disease should be developed in an attempt to protect birds from Pacheco's disease.

The US has encountered numerous psittacine-disease related incidents linking to Pacheco's disease:

In December 1977 and January 1978, multiple outbreaks had occurred in a privately owned bird import quarantine station that was located in Miami, Florida. In the first incident, the Floridan aviary imported three macaws from California into an aviary of eighteen healthy birds. This consisted of seven macaws, eight cockatoos, two hornbills and one mynah bird. Within a week, the newly imported macaws had died, followed by the other macaws and cockatoos that were originally residing in the Floridian aviary. The non-psittacine birds exposed to the virus spreading around in the aviary were not affected in this situation and survived the outbreak. In the second incident, two macaws and one cockatoo that were imported had died. The high mortality rate in this aviary was largely influenced by the overcrowding and stressful environment of the birds. This provided an ideal setting for Pacheco's disease to spread via bird-to-bird transmission. Examinations of the birds that were presented for necropsy showed that each died suddenly without clear evidence of any sicknesses other than lethargy. There are no linkages between both outbreaks.

In March 1991, an outbreak had occurred in an aviary in Wyoming, despite being closed to newly introduced birds for four years. Several bird species had died in this outbreak, including two golden mantle rosellas, two red-fronted parakeets, a yellow-bellied parrot, and a double-yellow headed Amazon parrot. These six birds showed few to no premonitory signs over the two weeks they resided in the aviary before its death. Medical examinations showed an absence of gross lesions while the clinical signs confirmed Pacheco's disease as cause of death. This included watery, green diarrhoea as well as depression that terminated in death within a day. It is suspected that the black-headed caique parrots or blue-and-gold macaws in the aviary were carriers of the virus.
