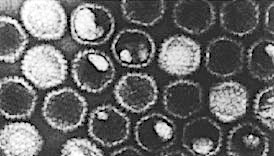
- Transmission electron micrograph of virions

Virus classification
- (unranked): Virus
- Realm: Duplodnaviria
- Kingdom: Heunggongvirae
- Phylum: Peploviricota
- Class: Herviviricetes
- Order: Herpesvirales
- Family: Orthoherpesviridae
- Genus: Iltovirus
- Species: Iltovirus gallidalpha1

Synonyms
- Avian herpesvirus 1; Avian infectious laryngotracheitis virus; Gallid alphaherpesvirus 1; Gallid herpesvirus 1

= Gallid herpesvirus 1 =

Species of virus

Gallid herpesvirus 1 (GaHV-1) is a species of virus in the order Herpesvirales, family Orthoherpesviridae, subfamily Alphaherpesvirinae, and genus Iltovirus. Originally recognised in chickens in the United States in 1926, this virus causes avian infectious laryngotracheitis (abbreviated as AILT, ILT, or LT), a potentially fatal, economically deleterious disease, widely recognised as one of the most contagious diseases in the poultry industry. The virus and its associated disease also occur in pheasants.

== Taxonomy ==
Gallid herpesvirus 1 is classified in the genus Iltovirus.

There are two other herpesviruses that affect chickens: Gallid herpesvirus 2 (cause of Marek's disease) and Gallid herpesvirus 3. Both of these are in a separate genus to Gallid herpesvirus 1; Mardivirus, which is united with Iltovirus under the same subfamily; Alphaherpesvirinae.

== Pathology ==
=== Transmission ===
GaHV-1 is shed in respiratory secretions and transmitted by droplet inhalation or via fomites. A previously unexposed flock will develop cases for two to eight weeks following introduction. The incubation period is two to eight days.

=== Clinical signs and diagnosis ===
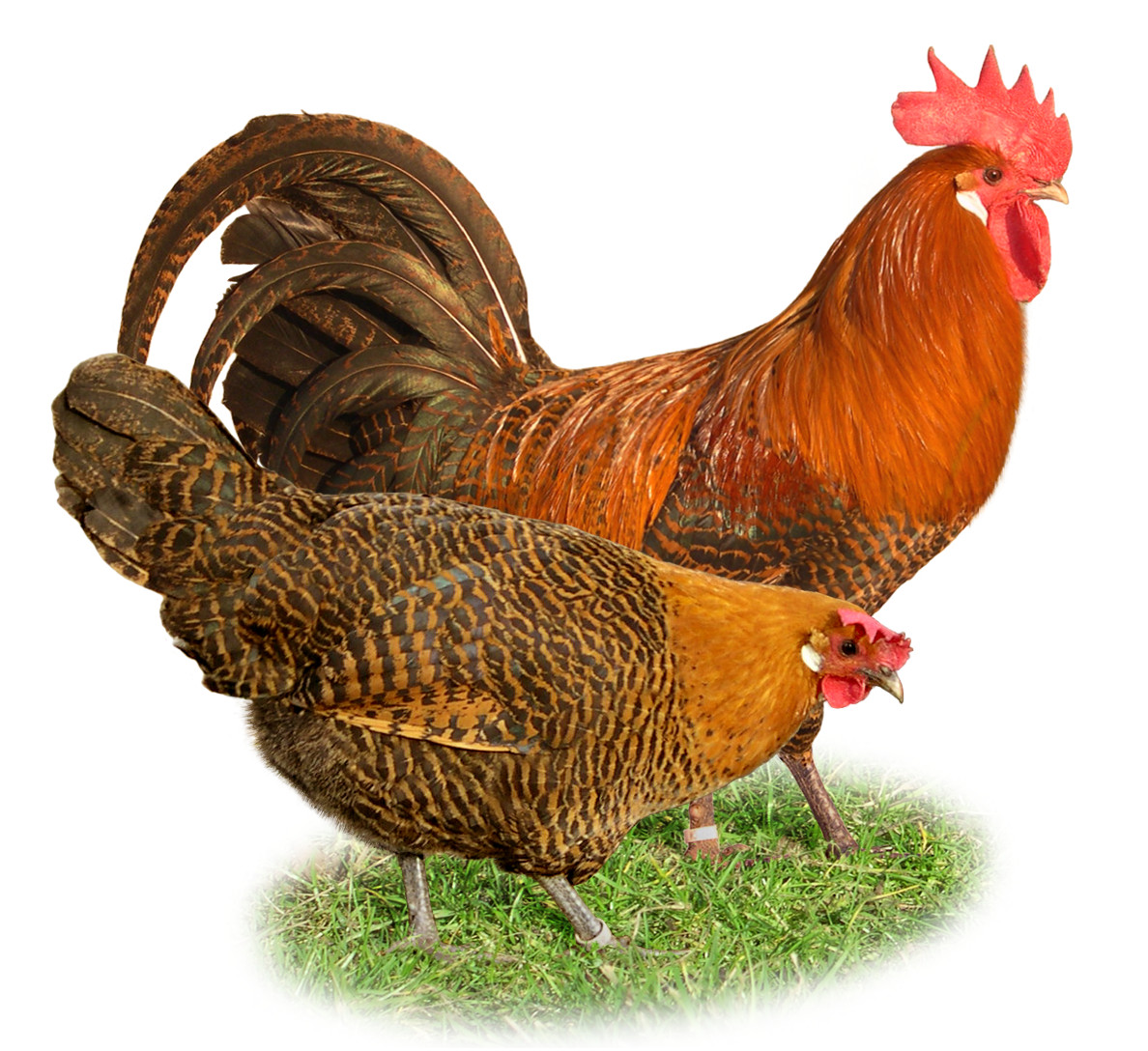
Uninfected domestic chickens (Gallus gallus domesticus); a typical host

Symptoms include coughing, sneezing, head shaking, lethargy, discharge from the eyes and nostrils (sometimes bloody), and difficulty breathing. The name comes from the severe inflammation of the larynx and trachea. A diphtheritic membrane may form in the trachea, causing obstruction. There may be problems in egg laying and the production of abnormal or thin-shelled eggs. Mortality is typically less than 15 percent.

Histopathology, PCR, ELISA, immunofluorescent staining, and viral isolation are all possible methods of diagnosis.

=== Treatment and control ===
A vaccine is available (ATCvet code: QI01AD08 (WHO)), but it is susceptible to undesired recombination and it does not prevent latent infections. It can be used during an outbreak to decrease morbidity and deaths.

A confirmed case will usually result in the establishment of a quarantine zone around the farm. Inside this quarantine zone, poultry workers will avoid poultry farms to prevent the spread of the virus. Biosecurity measures including quarantine, isolation, and disinfection are very important in controlling the spread of an outbreak.
