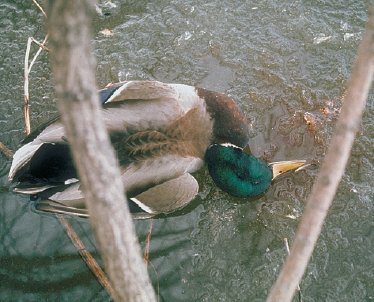
- Blood-stained ice from the nasal discharge of a mallard dying from duck plague

Virus classification
- (unranked): Virus
- Realm: Duplodnaviria
- Kingdom: Heunggongvirae
- Phylum: Peploviricota
- Class: Herviviricetes
- Order: Herpesvirales
- Family: Orthoherpesviridae
- Genus: Mardivirus
- Species: Mardivirus anatidalpha1

Synonyms
- Anatid alphaherpesvirus 1; Anatid herpesvirus 1; Duck enteritis virus; Duck plague virus

= Duck plague =

Duck enteritis virus

Disease caused by Duck enteritis virus

Duck plague (also known as duck viral enteritis) is a worldwide disease caused by Duck enteritis virus (DEV) of the family Herpesviridae that causes acute disease with high mortality rates in flocks of ducks, geese, and swans. It is spread both vertically and horizontally—through contaminated water and direct contact. Migratory waterfowl are a major factor in the spread of this disease as they are often asymptomatic carriers of disease. The incubation period is three to seven days. Birds as young as one week old can be infected. DEV is not zoonotic.

== Clinical signs and diagnosis ==
Upon exposure to DEV there is a 3-7 day for domestic fowl and up to a 14 day for wildfowl incubation period for the onset of symptoms. Sudden and persistent increases in flock mortality is often the first observation of DEV. Symptoms in individual birds include loss of appetite, decreased egg production (nearing 20-40% decreases), nasal discharge, increased thirst, diarrhea, ataxia, tremors, a drooped-wing appearance, and in males a prolapsed penis. Mortality rates for DEV may reach 90 percent. Death usually occurs within 5 days after onset of symptoms. The clinical signs of DEV "vary with virulence of virus strain, species, sex, and immune system status" of the host.

Due to the formation of diphtheroid plaques on the eyelids and the mucosae of the respiratory system and gastrointestinal system the bird may show ophthalmic signs and refuse to drink.

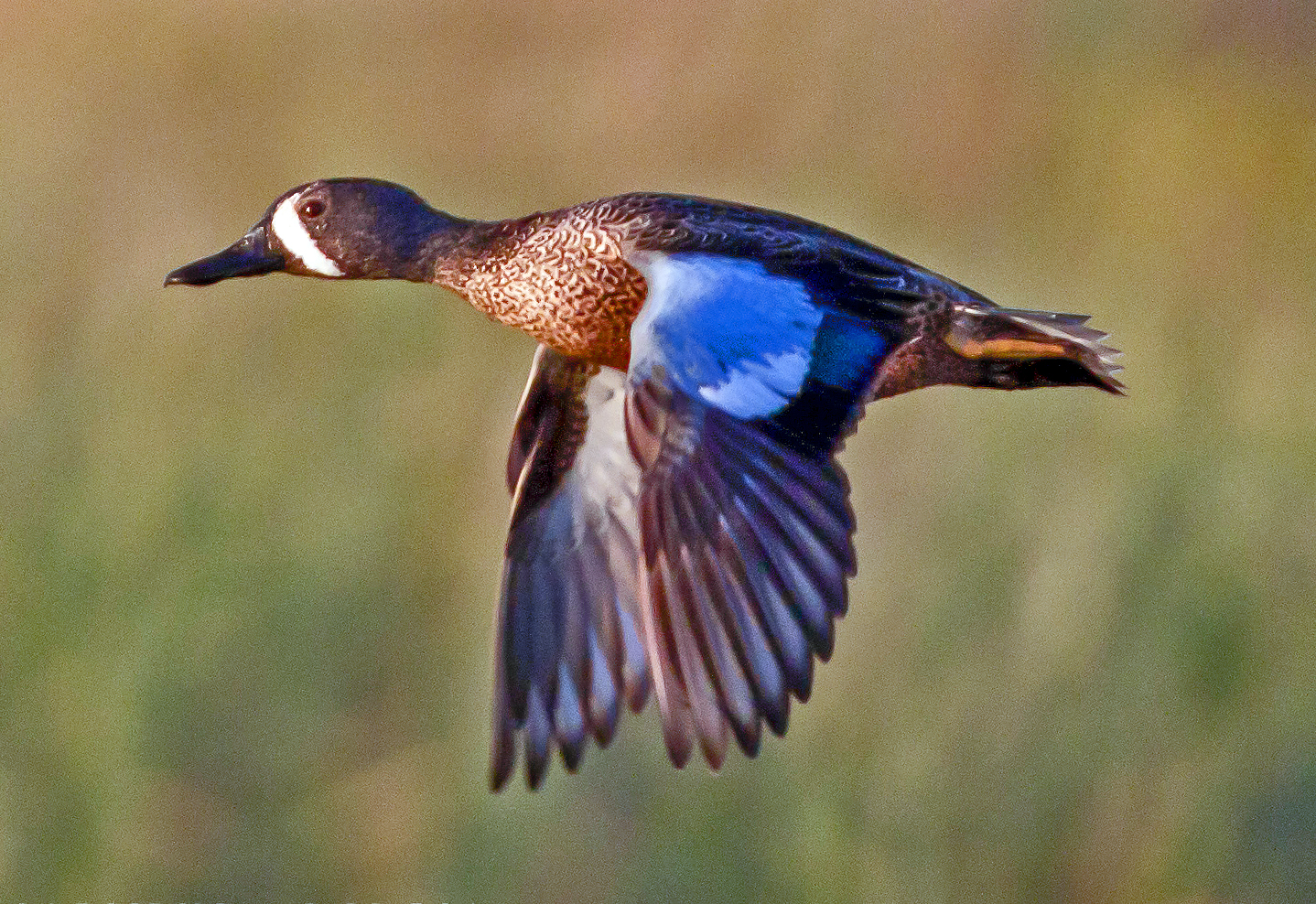
The Blue winged teal is one of the most susceptible species to DEV.

Duck enteritis virus can only infect birds of the family Anatidae of the order Anseriformes, with the possible exception of coots. A study of lesions found in "coots (order Gruiformes)" found similarities to DEV lesions. This could be evidence that DEV is able to "cross to different orders and families" or "adapted to new hosts." Waterfowl species have differing susceptibility to DEV, with wild fowl tending to be more resistant. Nonwaterfowl have not been shown to be infected by duck plague. Blue-winged teal have been found to be one of the most susceptible species and mallards one of the least. In another it took 300,000 more virus material to infect northern pintail than to infect blue-winged teal.

Diagnosis can usually be made based on the clinical signs and postmortem findings:

On post-mortem, petechial haemorrhage in the conjunctivae, mucous membranes, trachea, syrinx and intestine are pathognomonic for DEV. Diagnosis can also be confirmed with presence of virus inclusion bodies in tissues or a positive immunohistochemical staining for viral antigen.

== Epidemiology ==
DEV is found during the spring seasons across the globe. The United States, Netherlands, and UK have the most occurrences from March to June. Whereas, Southern Hemisphere populations, such as in Brazil, are more likely to have outbreaks November through February during their spring season.

If host organisms survive primary infection, they enter a latent stage lasting up to 4 years. Latent stage leads to vertical and horizontal transmission of DEV. Virus particles can be shed by the latent host in shared water or through direct contact (horizontal transmission), contributing to on-going epizootics. There is also evidence of vertical transmission from latent host carriers to their eggs and offspring, which will also be asymptomatic. However, during times of stress DEV may move to nerve roots from nerve ganglia and "induce herpetic lesions", a visible symptom of latency carrying. Environmental and physiological cues cause latent carriers to shed viral particles. Examples of physiological cues include "stress of migration, breeding season, [and] social interaction." Primary latency sites in carries are the trigeminal ganglion, lymphoid tissue, and blood lymphocytes. The latency sites of DEV is similar to other herpesviruses.

== Treatment and control ==
Vaccination for duck viral enteritis is now routine in the United States. Only attenuated vaccines are efficacious. Once DEV is present, depopulation, relocation and intensive disinfection are required to overcome an outbreak. Solid natural immunity develops in recovered birds. There is no treatment for DEV, but resveratrol has shown to have some antiviral activity against the virus.

Management practices such as preventing exposure to wild waterfowl and contaminated water and screening of new stock should be performed to prevent disease.

== Pathogenesis ==
DEV is considered pantropic because it is able to replicate and spread to multiple organs within the host. Viral replication causes an increase in vascular permeability, which leads to the lesions and hemorrhaging of organs, namely the liver, spleen, thymus, and bursa of Fabricius. DVH-1 replicates in the mucous membranes of bird's esophagus and cloaca, the two primary entrances of the virus. The means of infection influences which tissues will be affected first and the incubation time before symptoms show. Typically viral replication begins in the digestive track and moves to bursa of Fabricuis, thymus, spleen, and liver.

== Virology ==
=== Classification ===
DEV is classified as the species Mardivirus anatidalpha1 in the genus Mardivirus, under the subfamily Alphaherpesvirinae of the family Herpesviridae in the order Herpesvirales. Genomic evidence shows that DEV is genetically similar to Human alphaherpesvirus 1 and 2 (HSV-1 and HSV-2), Suid alphaherpesvirus 1, Equid alphaherpesvirus 1 and 4 (EHV-1 and EHV-4), and Bovine alphaherpesvirus 1 (BHV-1).

=== Genome ===
Duck enteritis virus, similar to other herpesviruses, has a linear double stranded DNA genome. The dsDNA weight is 119×10^{6} daltons and approximately 158,091 base pairs long. DEV has 67 genes in its genome, 65 of which are likely coding genes. Three of the genes have no homologs to other herpesviruses, and are unique to DEV. Unique long (UL), unique (US), unique short internal repeat (IRS), and unique short terminal repeat (TRS) regions make up the genome. The genomic arrangement is ordered as UL-IRS-US-TRS. There are 78 predicted proteins encoded by the genome.

=== Structure ===
DEV has similar morphology to other Herpesvirales viruses. Common elements of herpesviruses include a "DNA core, icosahedral capsid, tegument, and envelope." The nucleocapsid of HPV-1 is 75 micrometers wide and the envelope diameter is 181 micrometers.

=== Replication and transcription cycle ===
Three phases (immediate early (IE), early (E), and late (L)) of infection dictate the transcription of certain DEV genes. Immediate early begins after infection and before viral DNA replication. During this phase IE genes are transcribed without other proteins. The E genes are also transcribed before viral DNA replication, but are dependent on the IE gene products. After entering the host organism a virion begins the process of replication by first attaching to cells using glycoprotein spikes. gB, gC, gD, gH, and gL are known to be involved. Similar Alphaviruses use gC protein to aid in binding the virion to the cell and gD to stabilize it, if required. gB, gD, gH, and gL proteins allow for fusion of the cell and envelope, and are necessary for survival.

Entrance to host cells begins infection, and is largely controlled by the US 2 viral protein. Envelope fusion with the plasma membrane of the host cell causes separation of the nucleocapsid from viral DNA and proteins. Multiple necessary viral proteins are located within the envelope. DNA and proteins enter the host cell nucleus and turn-off host cell synthesis of nucleic acids, proteins, and other macro molecules. There are two hypothesized origins of replication in the IRS and TRS regions of the genome. Immature capsids are formed from coiled DNA. L genes are transcribed "after the synthesis of DNA and viral protein onset." Virion DNA maturation occurs as the nucleocapsids "bud through nuclear membrane." Completed viral replication occurs within 12 hours of infection. Vacuoles of mature virions are formed and released via exocytosis to other cells. Epithelial, lymphocytes, and macrophages are the favored sites of replication in the host organism.

== History ==
The first report of a DEV outbreak was 1923 in the Netherlands. Duck plague was first reported in the United States on Long Island, New York. The outbreak had economically devastating effects on the duck industry. The 1973 Lake Andes, South Dakota DEV outbreak was the other major incidence of the disease in the United States. The outbreak resulted in 43,000 deaths. In 2005 DEV was removed from the World Organisation for Animal Health (OIE) mandatory reporting list due to lack of evidence for international spread and minimal threat to public health. However, there are economic concerns for regions depending on fowl industry, such as India.
