= Macacine herpesvirus 3 =

Virus classification
- (unranked): Virus
- Realm: Duplodnaviria
- Kingdom: Heunggongvirae
- Phylum: Peploviricota
- Class: Herviviricetes
- Order: Herpesvirales
- Family: Orthoherpesviridae
- Genus: Simplexvirus
- Species: Simplexvirus macacinealpha3

Synonyms
- Macacine alphaherpesvirus 3; Macacine herpesvirus 3; Pig-tailed macaque herpesvirus 1

Species of virus

Macacine herpesvirus 3 (McHV-3), also called Pig-tailed macaque herpesvirus 1, is a species of virus in the genus Simplexvirus, subfamily Alphaherpesvirinae, family Orthoherpesviridae, and order Herpesvirales.
