= Herpesvirus papio 2 =

Virus classification
- (unranked): Virus
- Realm: Duplodnaviria
- Kingdom: Heunggongvirae
- Phylum: Peploviricota
- Class: Herviviricetes
- Order: Herpesvirales
- Family: Orthoherpesviridae
- Genus: Simplexvirus
- Species: Simplexvirus papiinealpha2

Synonyms
- Herpesvirus papio 2; Papiine alphaherpesvirus 2

Species of virus

Herpesvirus papio 2, also called Papiine alphaherpesvirus 2 (PaHV-2), is a species of virus in the genus Simplexvirus, subfamily Alphaherpesvirinae, family Orthoherpesviridae, and order Herpesvirales.
