= Simian agent 8 =

Virus classification
- (unranked): Virus
- Realm: Duplodnaviria
- Kingdom: Heunggongvirae
- Phylum: Peploviricota
- Class: Herviviricetes
- Order: Herpesvirales
- Family: Orthoherpesviridae
- Genus: Simplexvirus
- Species: Simplexvirus cercopithecinealpha2

Synonyms
- Cercopithecine alphaherpesvirus 2; Simian agent 8

Species of virus

Simian agent 8, also called Cercopithecine alphaherpesvirus 2 (CeHV-2), is a species of virus in the genus Simplexvirus, subfamily Alphaherpesvirinae, family Orthoherpesviridae, and order Herpesvirales.
