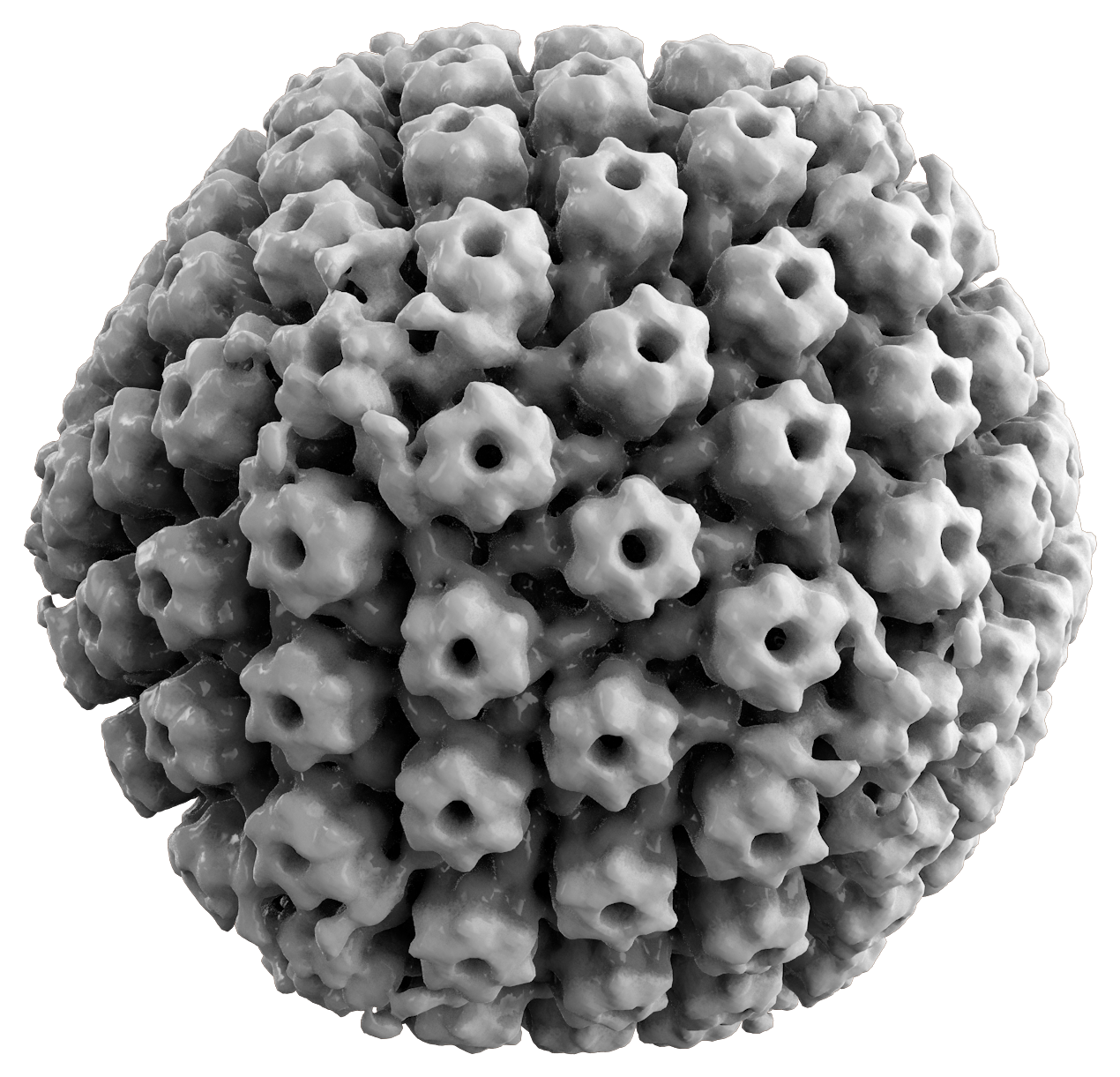
- 3D computer reconstruction of a Human herpesvirus 1 capsid

Virus classification
- (unranked): Virus
- Realm: Duplodnaviria
- Kingdom: Heunggongvirae
- Phylum: Peploviricota
- Class: Herviviricetes
- Order: Herpesvirales
- Family: Orthoherpesviridae
- Subfamily: Alphaherpesvirinae
- Genus: Simplexvirus

Species
- See text

= Simplexvirus =

Genus of viruses

Simplexvirus is a genus of viruses in the order Herpesvirales, in the family Orthoherpesviridae, in the subfamily Alphaherpesvirinae. Mammals, including humans, serve as natural hosts. Diseases associated with this genus include skin vesicles or mucosal ulcers, rarely encephalitis, and meningitis.

== Species ==
The genus contains the following species, listed by scientific name and followed by the common name of the species:

- Simplexvirus atelinealpha1, Ateline herpesvirus 1
- Simplexvirus bovinealpha2, Bovine herpesvirus 2
- Simplexvirus cercopithecinealpha2, Simian agent 8
- Simplexvirus humanalpha1, Herpes simplex virus 1
- [Simplexvirus humanalpha2, Herpes simplex virus 2
- Simplexvirus leporidalpha4, Leporid herpesvirus 4
- Simplexvirus macacinealpha1, B virus
- Simplexvirus macacinealpha2, Lion-tailed macaque herpesvirus 1
- Simplexvirus macacinealpha3, Macacine herpesvirus 3
- Simplexvirus macropodidalpha1, Macropodid herpesvirus 1
- Simplexvirus macropodidalpha2, Macropodid herpesvirus 2
- Simplexvirus macropodidalpha4, Macropodid herpesvirus 4
- Simplexvirus paninealpha3, Chimpanzee herpesvirus
- Simplexvirus papiinealpha2, Herpesvirus papio 2
- Simplexvirus pteropodidalpha1, Fruit bat herpesvirus 1
- Simplexvirus pteropodidalpha2, Pteropus lylei-associated alphaherpesvirus
- Simplexvirus saimiriinealpha1, Saimiriine herpesvirus 1

== Structure ==
Viruses in Simplexvirus are enveloped, with icosahedral, spherical to pleomorphic, and round geometries, and T=16 symmetry. The diameter is around 150-200 nm. Genomes are linear and unsegmented, around 152kb in length.

Genus	Structure	Symmetry	Capsid	Genomic arrangement	Genomic segmentation
Simplexvirus	Spherical pleomorphic	T=16	Enveloped	Linear	Monopartite

== Lifecycle ==
Viral replication is nuclear, and is lysogenic. Entry into the host cell is achieved by attachment of the viral gB, gC, gD, and gH proteins to host receptors, which mediates endocytosis. Replication follows the dsDNA bidirectional replication model. DNA-templated transcription, with some alternative splicing mechanism, is the method of transcription. Translation takes place by leaky scanning. The virus exits the host cell by nuclear egress, budding, and microtubular outwards viral transport. Human and mammals serve as the natural hosts. Transmission routes are sexual, contact, and saliva.

Genus	Host details	Tissue tropism	Entry details	Release details	Replication site	Assembly site	Transmission
Simplexvirus	Humans; mammals	Epithelial mucosa	Cell receptor endocytosis	Budding	Nucleus	Nucleus	Saliva
