= Fruit bat herpesvirus 1 =

Virus classification
- (unranked): Virus
- Realm: Duplodnaviria
- Kingdom: Heunggongvirae
- Phylum: Peploviricota
- Class: Herviviricetes
- Order: Herpesvirales
- Family: Orthoherpesviridae
- Genus: Simplexvirus
- Species: Simplexvirus pteropodidalpha1

Synonyms
- Pteropodid alphaherpesvirus 1; Fruit bat alphaherpesvirus 1; Fruit bat herpesvirus 1

Species of virus

Fruit bat herpesvirus 1 is a species of virus in the family Orthoherpesviridae.
