= Columbid herpesvirus 1 =

Virus classification
- (unranked): Virus
- Realm: Duplodnaviria
- Kingdom: Heunggongvirae
- Phylum: Peploviricota
- Class: Herviviricetes
- Order: Herpesvirales
- Family: Orthoherpesviridae
- Genus: Mardivirus
- Species: Mardivirus columbidalpha1

Synonyms
- Columbid alphaherpesvirus 1; Columbid herpesvirus 1

Species of virus afflicting pigeons

Columbid herpesvirus 1 (CoHV-1) is a species of virus in the genus Mardivirus, subfamily Alphaherpesvirinae, family Orthoherpesviridae, and order Herpesvirales. It is also known as pigeon herpesvirus, as it afflicts pigeons.
