= Chimpanzee herpesvirus =

Virus classification
- (unranked): Virus
- Realm: Duplodnaviria
- Kingdom: Heunggongvirae
- Phylum: Peploviricota
- Class: Herviviricetes
- Order: Herpesvirales
- Family: Orthoherpesviridae
- Genus: Simplexvirus
- Species: Simplexvirus paninealpha3

Synonyms
- Chimpanzee herpesvirus; Panine alphaherpesvirus 3

Species of virus

Chimpanzee herpesvirus, also called Panine alphaherpesvirus 3 (PnHV-3), is a species of virus in the genus Simplexvirus, subfamily Alphaherpesvirinae, family Orthoherpesviridae, and order Herpesvirales.
