= Bovine herpesvirus 2 =

Virus classification
- (unranked): Virus
- Realm: Duplodnaviria
- Kingdom: Heunggongvirae
- Phylum: Peploviricota
- Class: Herviviricetes
- Order: Herpesvirales
- Family: Orthoherpesviridae
- Genus: Simplexvirus
- Species: Simplexvirus bovinealpha2

Synonyms
- Bovid herpesvirus 2; Bovine herpesvirus 2; Bovine alphaherpesvirus 2; BoHV-2

Species of virus

Bovine herpesvirus 2 (BoHV2) is a virus of the family Herpesviridae. It causes two diseases in cattle, bovine mammillitis and pseudo-lumpy skin disease.

== Pathology ==
Pseudo-lumpy skin disease was originally discovered in South Africa where a similar but more serious disease caused by a poxvirus, lumpy skin disease, is also prevalent. Symptoms include fever and skin nodules on the face, back, and perineum. The disease heals within a few weeks. Bovine mammillitis is characterized by lesions restricted to the teats and udder. BoHV-2 probably spreads through an arthropod vector, but can also be spread through milkers and milking machines.

A review publication from 2011 presents a series of controversial but scientifically based conclusions concerning the pathogenesis and epidemiology of the infection, among these that spread among cattle is preferably by the respiratory route, and that skin lesions result from viremic spread to epidermal foci and inflammation due to complement activation by the classical pathway at sites of virus propagation after formation of early antibody to BoHV2. Lesions may be aggravated by low skin temperature (e.g. in edematic or hairless skin areas) causing reduced blood circulation and hampered removal of cell-toxic inflammatory substances.

== Morphology ==
BoHV2 is similar in structure to human herpes simplex virus.
