= Saimiriine herpesvirus 1 =

Virus classification
- (unranked): Virus
- Realm: Duplodnaviria
- Kingdom: Heunggongvirae
- Phylum: Peploviricota
- Class: Herviviricetes
- Order: Herpesvirales
- Family: Orthoherpesviridae
- Genus: Simplexvirus
- Species: Simplexvirus saimiriinealpha1

Synonyms
- Saimiriine alphaherpesvirus 1; Saimiriine herpesvirus 1

Species of virus

Saimiriine herpesvirus 1 (SaHV-1) is a species of virus in the genus Simplexvirus, subfamily Alphaherpesvirinae, family Orthoherpesviridae, and order Herpesvirales.
