= Leporid herpesvirus 4 =

Virus classification
- (unranked): Virus
- Realm: Duplodnaviria
- Kingdom: Heunggongvirae
- Phylum: Peploviricota
- Class: Herviviricetes
- Order: Herpesvirales
- Family: Orthoherpesviridae
- Genus: Simplexvirus
- Species: Simplexvirus leporidalpha4

Synonyms
- Leporid alphaherpesvirus 4; Leporid herpesvirus 4

Species of virus

Leporid herpesvirus 4 (LeHV-4) is a species of virus in the genus Simplexvirus, subfamily Alphaherpesvirinae, family Orthoherpesviridae, and order Herpesvirales.
