= Macropodid herpesvirus 2 =

Virus classification
- (unranked): Virus
- Realm: Duplodnaviria
- Kingdom: Heunggongvirae
- Phylum: Peploviricota
- Class: Herviviricetes
- Order: Herpesvirales
- Family: Orthoherpesviridae
- Genus: Simplexvirus
- Species: Simplexvirus macropodidalpha2

Synonyms
- Macropodid alphaherpesvirus 2; Macropodid herpesvirus 2; Dorcopsis-Wallaby-Herpesvirus

Species of virus

Macropodid herpesvirus 2 (MaHV-2) is a species of herpesvirus in the genus Simplexvirus. It was officially accepted as a valid species by the International Committee on Taxonomy of Viruses in 2004.

== Hosts ==
Macropodid herpesvirus 2 has been detected in two species of captive macropods: grey dorcopsis (Dorcopsis luctuosa) and quokkas (Setonix brachyurus).

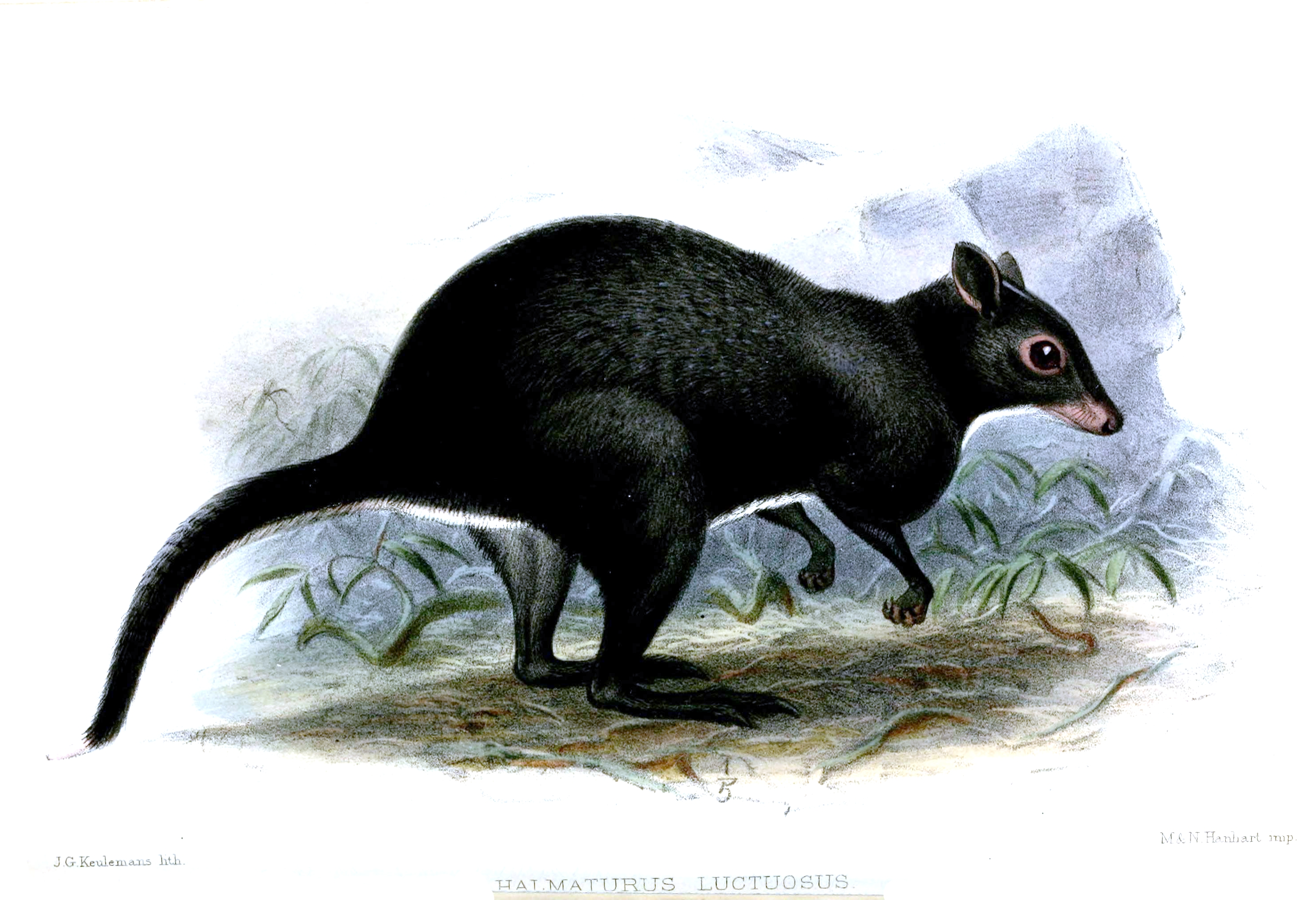
Illustration of healthy Dorcopsis luctuosa

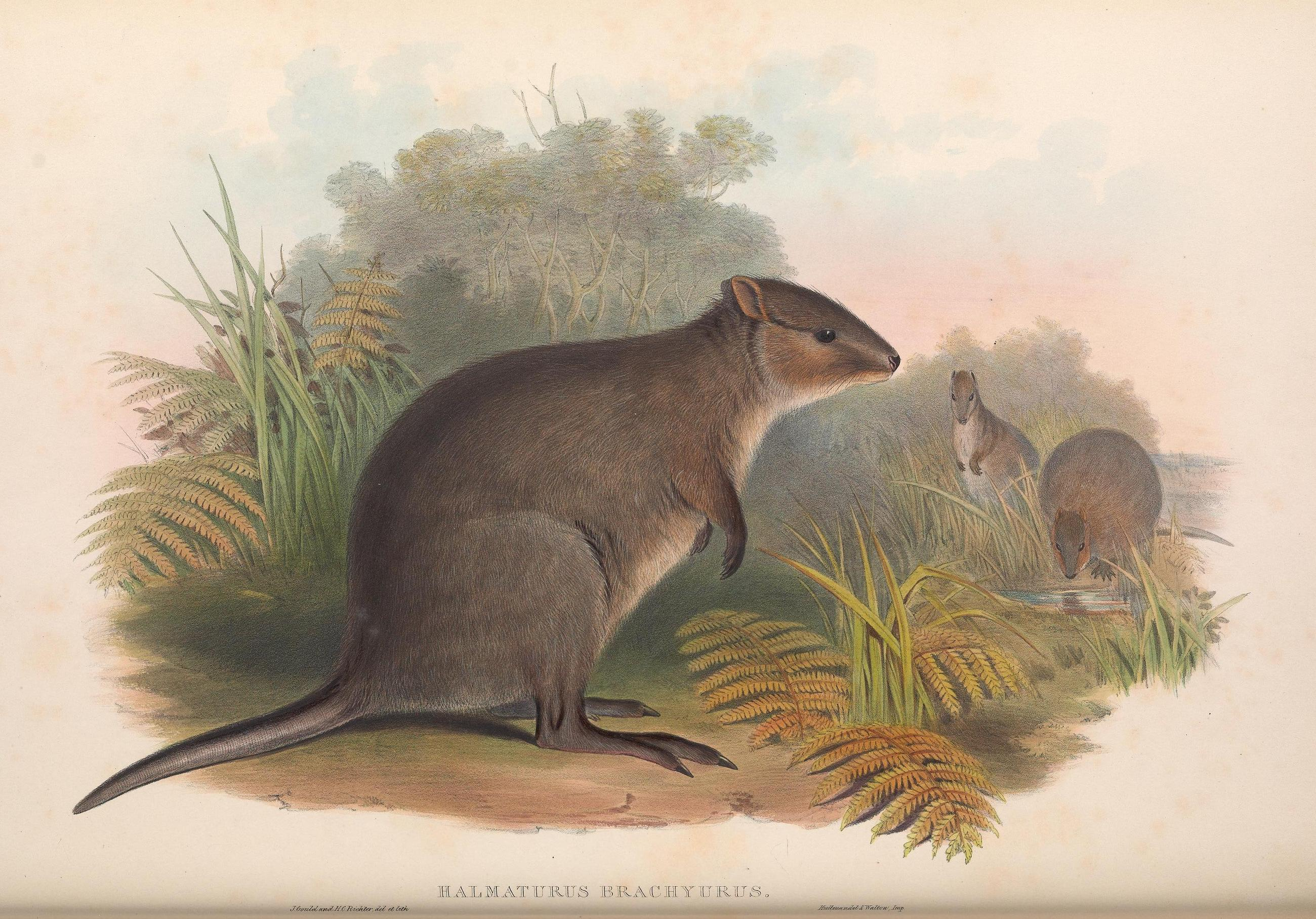
Illustration of healthy Setonix brachyurus

== See also ==
- Macropodid herpesvirus 1
