= Macropodid herpesvirus 1 =

Virus classification
- (unranked): Virus
- Realm: Duplodnaviria
- Kingdom: Heunggongvirae
- Phylum: Peploviricota
- Class: Herviviricetes
- Order: Herpesvirales
- Family: Orthoherpesviridae
- Genus: Simplexvirus
- Species: Simplexvirus macropodidalpha1

Synonyms
- Macropodid alphaherpesvirus 1; Macropodid herpesvirus 1; Parma-Wallaby-Herpesvirus

Species of virus in the genus Simplexvirus affecting macropodids

Macropodid herpesvirus 1 (MaHV-1) is a species of herpesvirus in the genus Simplexvirus. It was officially accepted as a valid species by the International Committee on Taxonomy of Viruses in 2004.

== Hosts ==
It has been detected in captive parma wallabies (Macropus parma) while some other marsupial species have been found to be susceptible to infection when experimentally inoculated.

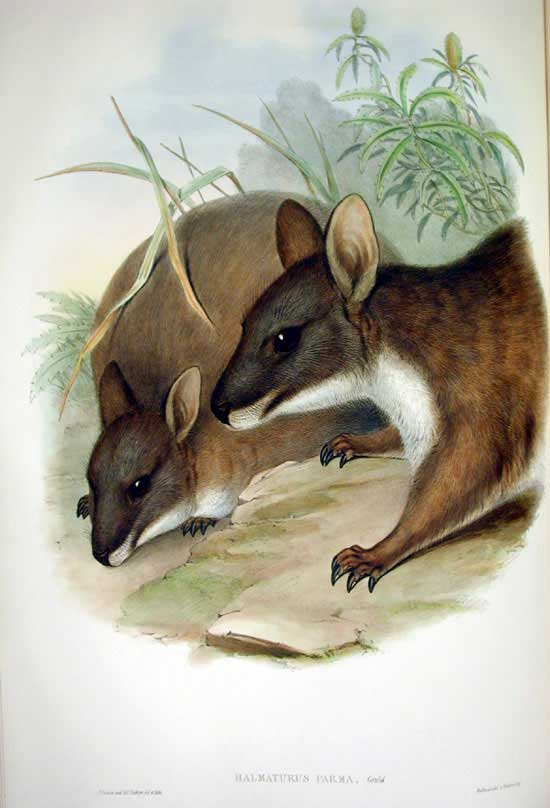
Illustration of healthy Macropus parma

== See also ==
- Macropodid herpesvirus 2
