= Lion-tailed macaque herpesvirus 1 =

Virus classification
- (unranked): Virus
- Realm: Duplodnaviria
- Kingdom: Heunggongvirae
- Phylum: Peploviricota
- Class: Herviviricetes
- Order: Herpesvirales
- Family: Orthoherpesviridae
- Genus: Simplexvirus
- Species: Simplexvirus macacinealpha2

Synonyms
- Lion-tailed macaque herpesvirus 1; Macacine alphaherpesvirus 2

Species of virus

Lion-tailed macaque herpesvirus 1, also called Macacine alphaherpesvirus 2 (McHV-2), is a species of virus in the genus Simplexvirus, subfamily Alphaherpesvirinae, family Orthoherpesviridae, and order Herpesvirales.
