= Meleagrid herpesvirus 1 =

Virus classification
- (unranked): Virus
- Realm: Duplodnaviria
- Kingdom: Heunggongvirae
- Phylum: Peploviricota
- Class: Herviviricetes
- Order: Herpesvirales
- Family: Orthoherpesviridae
- Genus: Mardivirus
- Species: Mardivirus meleagridalpha1

Synonyms
- Meleagrid alphaherpesvirus 1; Meleagrid herpesvirus 1

Species of virus

Meleagrid herpesvirus 1 (MeHV-1) is a species of virus in the genus Mardivirus, subfamily Alphaherpesvirinae, family Orthoherpesviridae, and order Herpesvirales.
