= Laryngotracheitis =

Laryngotracheitis may refer to:

- the combination of the following two medical conditions: laryngitis and tracheitis
- a disease of poultry caused by Gallid alphaherpesvirus 1
