= Spheniscid alphaherpesvirus 1 =

Mardivirus spheniscidalpha1

Virus classification
- (unranked): Virus
- Realm: Duplodnaviria
- Kingdom: Heunggongvirae
- Phylum: Peploviricota
- Class: Herviviricetes
- Order: Herpesvirales
- Family: Orthoherpesviridae
- Genus: Mardivirus
- Species: Mardivirus spheniscidalpha1

Synonyms
- Spheniscid alphaherpesvirus 1

Species of virus

Spheniscid alphaherpesvirus 1 (SpAHV-1) is a species of virus in the genus Mardivirus, subfamily Alphaherpesvirinae, family Herpesviridae, and order Herpesvirales.
