= HSV-2 =

HSV-2 may refer to:

- Herpes simplex virus 2, a human pathogen
- HSV-2 Swift, a non-commissioned catamaran leased by the United States Navy
