= József Marek =

Hungarian veterinarian and scientist

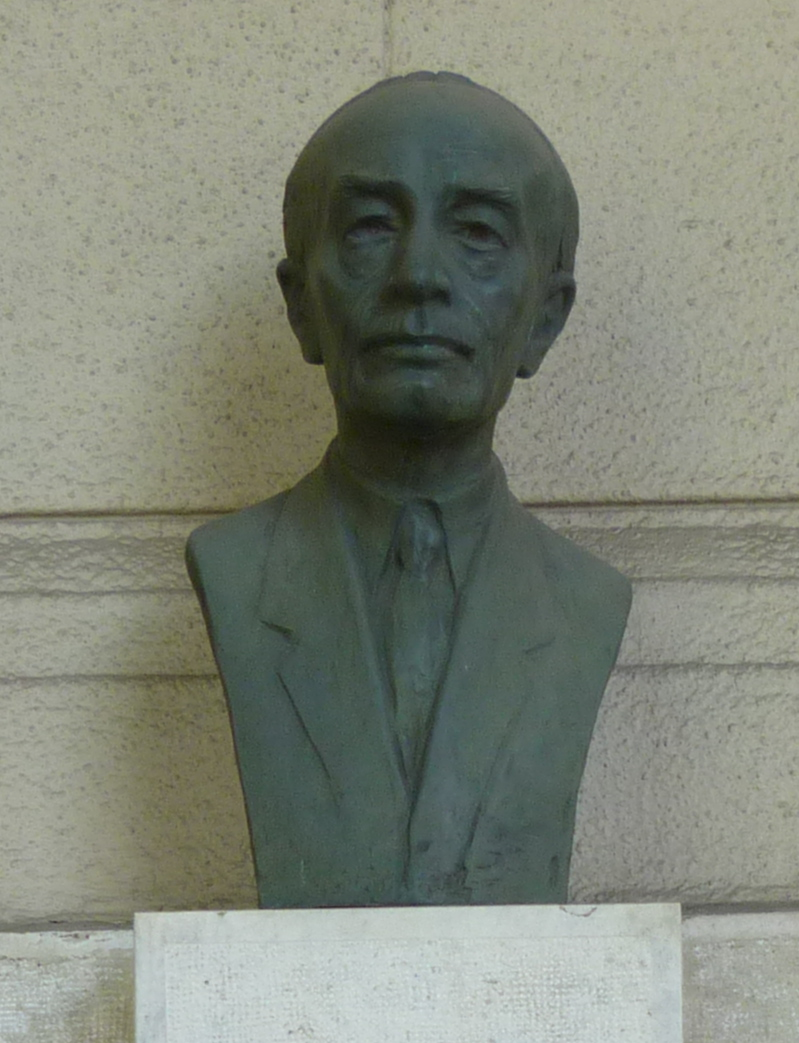
- Bust of József Marek in Kossuth Square, Budapest, at the wall of the agricultural ministry.
- Born: March 18, 1868; Vágszerdahely, Kingdom of Hungary (modern Horná Streda, Slovakia)
- Died: September 2, 1952 (aged 84)
- Resting place: Farkasréti Cemetery, Budapest
- Education: Royal Hungarian Veterinary School
- Alma mater: University of Bern, Switzerland
- Known for: Discovery of Marek's disease, authorship of veterinary textbooks
- Awards: Kossuth Prize (1949), Hungarian Heritage Award (2007)
- Scientific career
- Fields: Veterinary science
- Workplaces: Royal Hungarian Veterinary College
- Thesis: Das helvetisch-gallische Pferd und seine Beziehung zu den praehistorischen und zu den recenten Pferden (1898)

József Marek ([ˈjoːʒɛf ˈmɒrɛk]; March 18, 1868 – September 2, 1952) was a Hungarian veterinarian and scientist. Marek is best known for his discovery of the poultry disease that would eventually bear his name, Marek's disease. In his lifetime, Marek was known for his studies into various veterinary diseases, and particularly for his co-authorship of a textbook of veterinary internal medicine, which was translated into multiple languages and remained in print for over fifty years.

== Early life and education ==
Marek was born on March 18, 1868, in the village then known as Vágszerdahely, Nyitra County in the Kingdom of Hungary (today Horná Streda in Slovakia).

Following his elementary education, Marek completed his secondary education at the gymnasium at Nagyszombat (now Trnava, Slovakia). Marek attended the only veterinary school in Hungary, the Royal Hungarian Veterinary School in Budapest, from September 1, 1889, to November 5, 1892, when he graduated with a rarely awarded high mark. After Marek's graduation, the veterinary school in Budapest was renamed as the Royal Hungarian Veterinary College.

== Career ==
Marek began his veterinary career in Pest, Hungary, where he was chief veterinarian from 1892 to 1894.

In 1897, Marek was offered a position at the veterinary college in Budapest as a clinical assistant, equivalent to an adjunct professor. As it was required that teachers at the veterinary college held an advanced qualification, at the behest of his superiors, Marek went to the University of Bern in Switzerland in May 1897 to study for his doctorate, which he was awarded in April 1898. In May 1898, Marek went to the University of Vienna in Austria, and spent a few months studying diagnostic techniques and saw patients at the clinic there.

In January 1901, Marek took up the position of Director of Internal Medicine at the veterinary college in Budapest, a position he held until, approaching the age limit for working at the university, he retired on September 1, 1935.

In 1907, Marek published the first account of a poultry disease, in a paper entitled Multiple Nervenentzündung (Polyneuritis) bei Hühnern (Multiple inflammation of the nerves [polyneuritis] in chickens). This disease was later named Marek's disease. In the birds examined by Marek, the signs of the disease appeared in the nervous system, and therefore he termed the disease a polyneuritis. He did not determine what had caused the signs.

Marek was the first to adopt the general use of the nasogastric tube, known as the Marek tube, for the treatment of colic in horses. Working with Pál Pataki, he developed Distol, a proprietary remedy for the treatment of liver fluke in cattle, which was manufactured at the Chinoin Pharmaceutical Factory. Alongside Oszkár Wellmann and László Urbányi, he published several studies on rickets in animals, and studied classical swine fever and the horse disease dourine. Marek also published a study on the use of an endoscope in horses, and demonstrated an electromyography device at the 1900 Paris Exposition.

With Ferenc Hutÿra, Marek co-authored a two volume textbook in German, Spezielle Pathologie und Therapie der Haustiere (Special pathology and therapeutics of the diseases of domestic animals). Hutÿra wrote about infectious diseases, while Marek authored the text on non-infectious diseases. This textbook was published between 1905 and 1959 in eleven German language editions. It became a standard text in many countries, and was fully translated into Chinese, English, French, Italian, Polish, Russian, Serbian, Slovak, Spanish, Turkish, and partially into Finnish. This, and other textbooks, such as Lehrbuch der Klinischen Diagnostik der Inneren Krankheiten der Haustiere (Textbook of clinical diagnostics of internal diseases of domestic animals), along with 154 publications in scientific journals, established Marek's international reputation as an outstanding veterinary scientist.

Marek died on September 2, 1952. He is interred at the Farkasréti Cemetery, Budapest.

== Awards and recognition ==
Marek was a member of the Hungarian Academy of Sciences, first as an ordinary member, then an honorary member and also department chairman.

The University of Leipzig awarded Marek an honorary doctorate in 1930. In December 1931, the Budapest Royal Medical Association (Budapesti Királyi Orvosegyesület) awarded the Balassa Prize to Marek for his work on rickets. In 1949, Marek was awarded the Kossuth Prize.

Mark continued to be recognized posthumously. Two busts of Marek have been installed in Budapest. The first, created in 1954 by Ferenc Medgyessy, is at the veterinary school. The second, by Judit Englert in 1978, is at the ministry of agriculture.

In 1964, the agricultural vocational school at Mohács in Hungary was renamed in honor of Marek as the Dr. Marek József Mezőgazdasági Szakközépiskolában. A new building was inaugurated at the school in 1975, and a bust of Marek, sculpted by István Szabó, Jr., was unveiled in front of the building. The school has since closed. During renovation of the school buildings in 2017, the bust was stolen from where it had been placed for safe keeping.

The student hostel at the Budapest veterinary college was named in honor of Marek when it was opened in 1973.

As part of the commemorations of 200 years of veterinary education in Hungary, a stamp was issued bearing Marek's portrait on May 25, 1987. In 2001, a street in Komárno, Slovakia, was named in his honor, and in 2007, Marek was awarded the Hungarian Heritage Award for his "outstanding role in veterinary science".

== Works ==
=== Textbooks ===
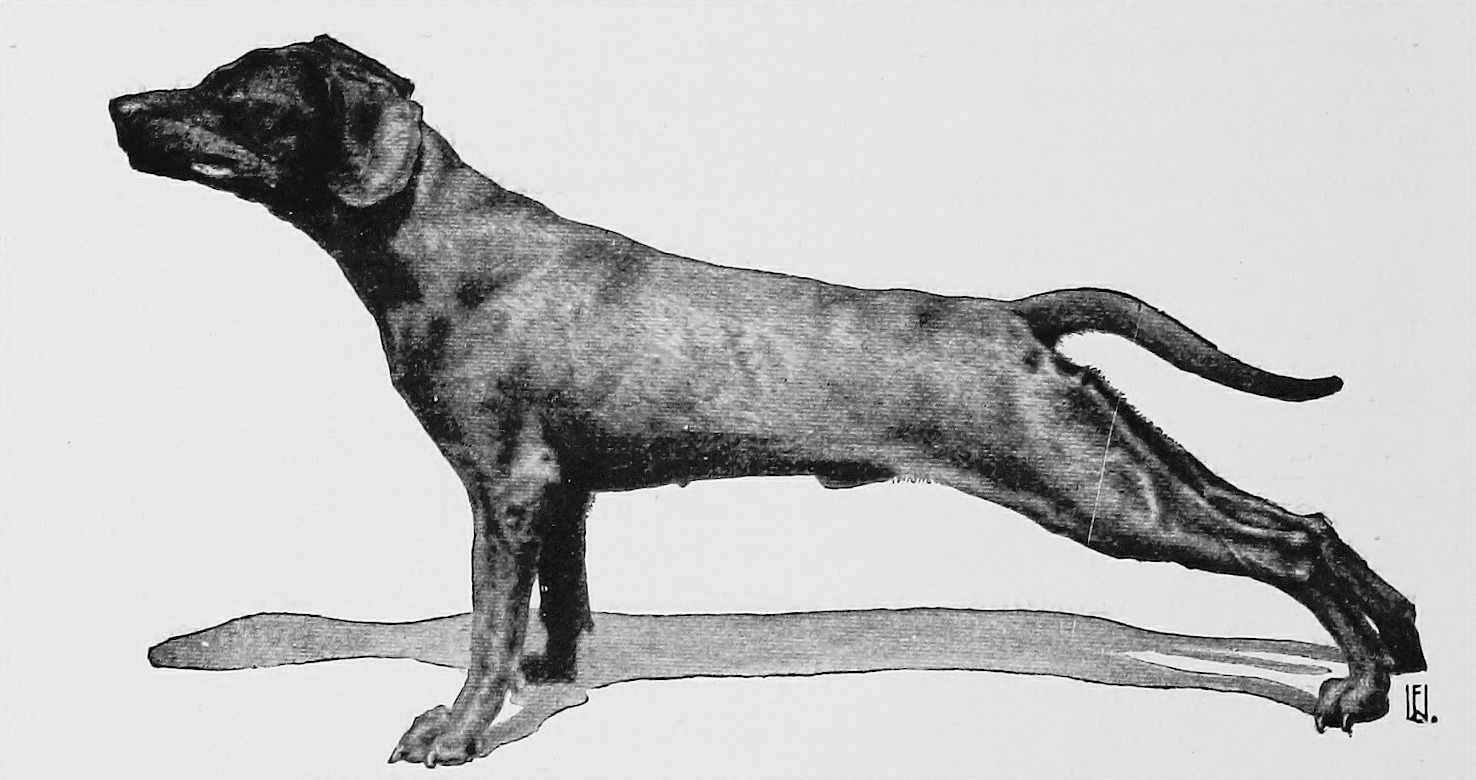
Image of a dog with tetanus, from Special pathology and therapeutics of the diseases of domestic animals (1912)

- Marek, József (1912). Lehrbuch der klinischen Diagnostik der inneren Krankheiten der Haustiere [Textbook of clinical diagnostics of internal diseases of domestic animals] (in German). Jena: G. Fischer. OCLC 246442107.
- Hutÿra, Ferenc; Marek, József (1912). Mohler, John Robbins; Eichhorn, Adolph (eds.). Special pathology and therapeutics of the diseases of domestic animals. Chicago: Alexander Eger. doi:10.5962/bhl.title.57835. Authorized American edition, from the third revised and enlarged German edition.

=== Selected scientific articles ===
- Marek, József (1898). Das helvetisch gallische Pferd und seine Beziehung zu den praehistorischen und zu den recenten Pferden [The Helvetic-Gallic horse and its relationship to prehistoric and recent horses] (PhD) (in German). University of Bern.
- Marek, József (July 27, 1907). "Multiple Nervenentzündung (Polyneuritis) bei Hühnern" [Multiple inflammation of the nerves (polyneuritis) in chickens]. Deutsche Tierärztliche Wochenschrift (in German). 15: 417–421.
- Marek, J. (June 1921). "The anthelmintic value of Distol against hookworms". Journal of the American Veterinary Medical Association. 59 (12): 306–309 – via Google Books.
- Marek, J.; Wellmann, O.; Urbanyi, L. (1938). "Weitere Untersuchungen uber Rachitis und Osteomalacie. 1" [Further studies of rickets and osteomalacia. 1]. Archiv für wissenschaftliche und praktische Tierheilkunde (in German). 73: 32–39. ISSN 0365-8473.
- Marek, J.; Wellmann, O.; Urbanyi, L. (1938). "Weitere Untersuchungen fiber Rachitis und Osteomalacie. 2" [Further studies of rickets and osteomalacia. 2]. Archiv für wissenschaftliche und praktische Tierheilkunde (in German). 73: 73–82. ISSN 0365-8473.
- Marek, J.; Wellmann, O.; Urbanyi, L. (1939). "Unterauchungen uber Rachitis und verwandte Knochenerkrankungen. 3. Versuche an Hunden" [Studies of rickets and related bone diseases. 3. Experiments on dogs]. Archiv für wissenschaftliche und praktische Tierheilkunde (in German). 74: 421–432. ISSN 0365-8473.
- Marek, J.; Wellmann, O.; Urbanyi, L. (1940). "Untersuchungen uber Rachitis und verwandte Knochenerkrankungen. 4. Vergleichende Versuche an Ferkeln verschiedener Rassen bei verschiedener Futterung" [Studies on rickets and related bone disorders. 4. Comparative trials with young pigs of various breeds, on different rations]. Archiv für wissenschaftliche und praktische Tierheilkunde (in German). 75: 180–195. ISSN 0365-8473.
