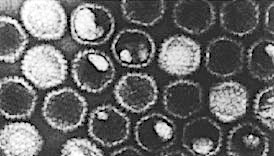
- Transmission electron micrograph of Gallid alphaherpesvirus 1 virions

Virus classification
- (unranked): Virus
- Realm: Duplodnaviria
- Kingdom: Heunggongvirae
- Phylum: Peploviricota
- Class: Herviviricetes
- Order: Herpesvirales
- Family: Orthoherpesviridae
- Subfamily: Alphaherpesvirinae
- Genus: Iltovirus

Species
- See text

= Iltovirus =

Genus of viruses

Iltovirus is a genus of viruses in the order Herpesvirales, in the family Orthoherpesviridae, in the subfamily Alphaherpesvirinae. Birds, galliform birds, psittacine birds, chickens, turkeys, and quail serve as natural hosts. Diseases associated with this genus include: acute respiratory diseases: gaHV-1: infectious laryngotracheitis; psHV-1: Pacheco's disease.

== Species ==
The genus consists of the following species, listed by scientific name and followed by the common name of the species:

- Iltovirus cacatuidalpha2, Cacatuid herpesvirus 2
- Iltovirus gallidalpha1, Gallid herpesvirus 1
- Iltovirus psittacidalpha1, Psittacid herpesvirus 1
- Iltovirus psittacidalpha5, Psittacid herpesvirus 5

== Structure ==
Viruses in Iltovirus are enveloped, with icosahedral, spherical to pleomorphic, and round geometries, and T=16 symmetry. The diameter is around 120-200 nm. Genomes are linear and non-segmented, around 150kb in length.

Genus	Structure	Symmetry	Capsid	Genomic arrangement	Genomic segmentation
Iltovirus	Spherical pleomorphic	T=16	Enveloped	Linear	Monopartite

== Life cycle ==
Viral replication is nuclear, and is lysogenic. Entry into the host cell is achieved by attachment of the viral gB, gC, gD and gH proteins to host receptors, which mediates endocytosis. Replication follows the dsDNA bidirectional replication model. DNA-templated transcription, with some alternative splicing mechanism is the method of transcription. The virus exits the host cell by nuclear egress, and budding. Birds, galliform birds, psittacine birds, chickens, turkeys, and quail serve as the natural host. Transmission routes are contact, contamination, and air borne particles.

Genus	Host details	Tissue tropism	Entry details	Release details	Replication site	Assembly site	Transmission
Iltovirus	Birds: galliform: psittacine	None	Cell receptor endocytosis	Budding	Nucleus	Nucleus	Oral-fecal; aerosol
