= Hungarian Heritage Award =

- Hungarian: Magyar Örökség díj
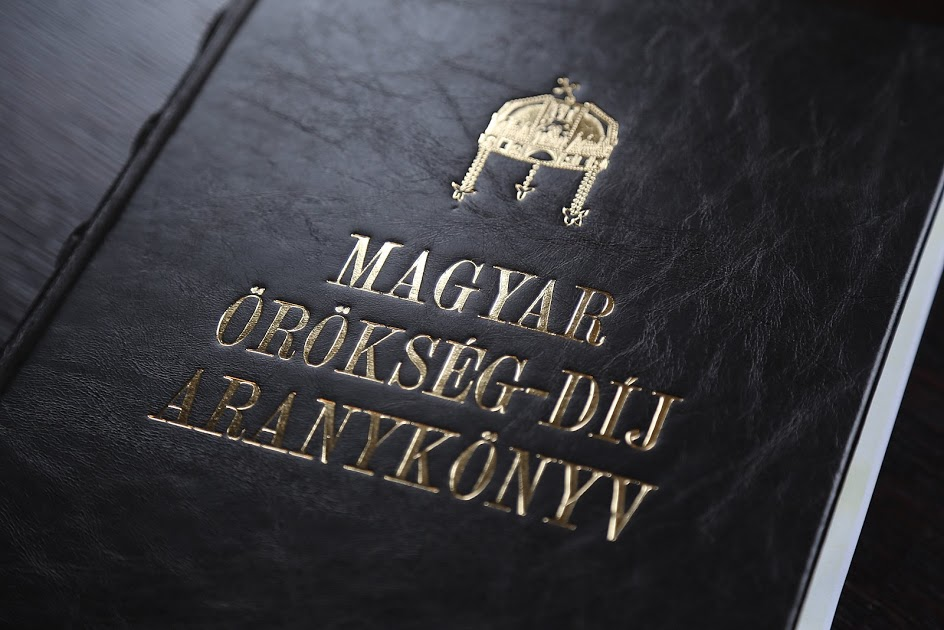
- The Hungarian Heritage Award golden book
- Date: December 21, 1995
- Location: Budapest
- Country: Hungary
- Website: www.magyarorokseg.hu

The Hungarian Heritage Award (Hungarian: Magyar Örökség díj) is a distinction awarded to Hungarian institutions or persons who have contributed to activities of Hungarian culture, economy, sports or science, to ensure the spiritual uplift of Hungarian society. The award was established in 1995.

The Hungarian Heritage and Europe Association (Magyar Örökség és Európa Egyesület) took over the award in March 2003 from The Foundation for Hungary (Magyarországért Alapítvány).

== Recipients ==
- Miklós Bánffy, writer – 2001
- Franz Liszt Academy of Music – 2007
- Endre Fülei-Szántó – 2005
- József Marek, veterinary scientist – 2007
- László Rédei, mathematician – 2007
- Albert Wass
