= Marek's disease =

Marek's disease virus

Virus classification
- (unranked): Virus
- Realm: Duplodnaviria
- Kingdom: Heunggongvirae
- Phylum: Peploviricota
- Class: Herviviricetes
- Order: Herpesvirales
- Family: Orthoherpesviridae
- Genus: Mardivirus
- Species: Mardivirus gallidalpha2

Synonyms
- Gallid alphaherpesvirus 2; Gallid herpesvirus 2; Marek's disease virus

Highly contagious viral neoplastic disease in chickens

Marek's disease is a highly contagious viral neoplastic disease in chickens. It is named after József Marek, a Hungarian veterinarian who described it in 1907. Marek's disease is caused by an alphaherpesvirus commonly known as "Marek's disease virus" (MDV). The disease is characterized by the presence of T cell lymphoma as well as infiltration of nerves and organs by lymphocytes. Viruses related to MDV appear to be benign and can be used as vaccine strains to prevent Marek's disease. For example, the related herpesvirus found in turkeys (HVT) continues to be used as a vaccine strain for prevention of Marek's disease. Turkeys can also become infected with Marek's disease.

Birds infected with MDV can be carriers and shedders of the virus for life. Newborn chicks are protected by maternal antibodies for a few weeks. After infection, microscopic lesions are present after one to two weeks, and gross lesions are present after three to four weeks. The virus is spread in dander from feather follicles and transmitted by inhalation.

== Syndromes ==
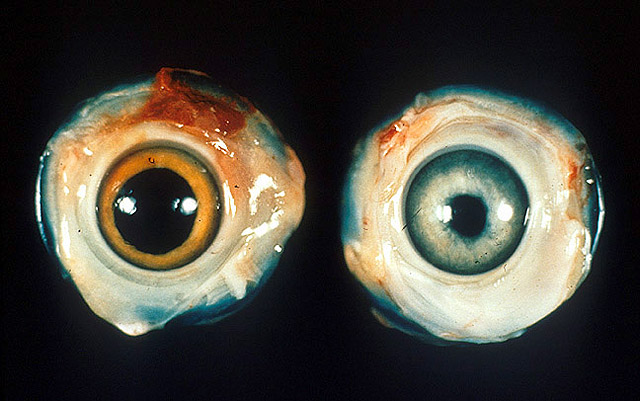
Left — normal chicken eye; Right — Eye of a chicken with Marek's disease.

Six syndromes are known to occur after infection with Marek's disease. These syndromes may overlap.

- Classical Marek's disease or neurolymphomatosis causes asymmetric paralysis of one or more limbs. With vagus nerve involvement, difficulty breathing or dilation of the crop may occur. Besides lesions in the peripheral nerves, there are frequently lymphomatous infiltration/tumours in the skin, skeletal muscle, visceral organs. Organs that are commonly affected include the ovary, spleen, liver, kidneys, lungs, heart, proventriculus and adrenals.
- Acute Marek's disease is an epidemic in a previously uninfected or unvaccinated flock, causing depression, paralysis, and death in a large number of birds (up to 80%). The age of onset is much earlier than the classic form; birds are four to eight weeks old when affected. Infiltration into multiple organs/tissue is observed.
- Ocular lymphomatosis causes lymphocyte infiltration of the iris (making the iris turn grey), unequal size of the pupils, and blindness.
- Cutaneous Marek's disease causes round, firm lesions at the feather follicles.
- Atherosclerosis is induced in experimentally infected chickens.
- Immunosuppression is impairment of the T-lymphocytes resulting from Marek's disease, preventing a competent immunological response against pathogenic challenge, with the affected birds become more susceptible to disease conditions such as coccidiosis and Escherichia coli infection. Furthermore, without stimulation by cell-mediated immunity, the humoral immunity conferred by the B-cell lines from the Bursa of Fabricius also shuts down, thus resulting in birds that are totally immunocompromised.

== Diagnosis ==
Diagnosis of lymphoid tumors in poultry is complicated due to multiple etiological agents capable of causing very similar tumors. It is not uncommon that more than one avian tumor virus can be present in a chicken, thus one must consider both the diagnosis of the disease/tumors (pathological diagnosis) and of the virus (etiological diagnosis). A step-wise process has been proposed for diagnosis of Marek's disease, which includes:

1. History, epidemiology, clinical observations and gross necropsy;
2. Characteristics of the tumor cell, and;
3. Virological characteristics

The demonstration of peripheral nerve enlargement along with suggestive clinical signs in a bird that is around three to four months old (with or without visceral tumors) is highly suggestive of Marek's disease. Histological examination of nerves reveals infiltration of pleomorphic neoplastic and inflammatory lymphocytes. Peripheral neuropathy should also be considered as a principal rule-out in young chickens with paralysis and nerve enlargement without visceral tumors, especially in nerves with interneuronal edema and infiltration of plasma cells.

The presence of nodules on the internal organs may also suggest Marek's disease, but further testing is required for confirmation. This is done through histological demonstration of lymphomatous infiltration into the affected tissue. A range of leukocytes can be involved, including lymphocytic cell lines such as large lymphocyte, lymphoblast, primitive reticular cells, and occasional plasma cells, as well as macrophage and plasma cells. The T cells are involved in the malignancy, showing neoplastic changes with evidence of mitosis. The lymphomatous infiltrates need to be differentiated from other conditions that affect poultry including lymphoid leukosis and reticuloendotheliosis, as well as an inflammatory event associated with hyperplastic changes of the affected tissue.

Key clinical signs as well as gross and microscopic features that are most useful for differentiating Marek's disease from lymphoid leukosis and reticuloendotheliosis include:

1. Age: Marek's disease can affect birds at any age, including <16 weeks of age;
2. Clinical signs: Frequent wing and leg paralysis;
3. Incidence: >5% in unvaccinated flocks;
4. Potential nerve enlargement;
5. Interfollicular tumors in the bursa of Fabricius;
6. CNS involvement;
7. Lymphoid proliferation in skin and feather follicles;
8. Pleomorphic lymphoid cells in nerves and tumors; and
9. T-cell lymphomas.

In addition to gross pathology and histology, other advanced procedures used for a definitive diagnosis of Marek's disease include immunohistochemistry to identify cell type and virus-specific antigens, standard and quantitative PCR for identification of the virus, virus isolation to confirm infections, and serology to confirm/exclude infections.

The World Organisation for Animal Health (OIE) reference laboratory for Marek's disease is Avian Viral Oncogenesis group (led by Professor Venugopal Nair OBE) at The Pirbright Institute, UK.

PCR blood testing can also detect Marek's disease, and proper testing can differentiate between a vaccinated bird with antibodies and a true positive for Marek's disease.

Marek's disease is not treatable, however, supportive care can help.

It is recommended that all flocks positive for Marek's disease remain closed, with no bird being introduced or leaving the flock. Strict biosecurity and proper cleaning is essential, using products like Activated Oxine or Virkon S and reducing dander buildup in the environment. Proper diet, regular deworming and vitamin supplements can also help keep infected flocks healthier. Reducing stress is also a key component, as stress will often bring about illness in birds infected with Marek's disease.

== Prevention ==
Vaccination is the only known method to prevent the development of tumors when chickens are infected with the virus. However, administration of the vaccine does not prevent an infected bird from shedding the virus, though it does reduce the amount of virus shed in the dander, hence reducing horizontal spread of the disease. Marek's disease does not spread vertically.

Before the development of the vaccine for Marek's disease, Marek's disease caused substantial revenue loss in the poultry industries of the United States and the United Kingdom. The vaccine can be administered to one-day-old chicks through subcutaneous inoculation or by in ovo vaccination when the eggs are transferred from the incubator to the hatcher. In ovo vaccination is the preferred method, as it does not require handling of the chicks and can be done rapidly by automated methods. Immunity develops within two weeks.

Because vaccination does not prevent infection with the virus, Marek's is still transmissible from vaccinated flocks to other birds, including the wild bird population. The first Marek's disease vaccine was introduced in 1970. The disease would cause mild paralysis, with the only identifiable lesions being in neural tissue. Mortality of chickens infected with Marek's disease was quite low. Current strains of Marek virus, decades after the first vaccine was introduced, cause lymphoma formation throughout the chicken's body and mortality rates have reached 100% in unvaccinated chickens. The Marek's disease vaccine is a "leaky vaccine", which means that only the symptoms of the disease are prevented. Infection of the host and transmission of the virus are not inhibited by the vaccine. This contrasts with most other vaccines, where infection of the host is prevented.

Under normal conditions, highly virulent strains of the virus are not selected for by evolution. This is because such a severe strain would kill the host before the virus would have an opportunity to transmit to other potential hosts and replicate. Thus, less virulent strains are selected. These strains are virulent enough to induce symptoms but not enough to kill the host, allowing further transmission. However, the leaky vaccine changes this evolutionary pressure and permits the evolution of highly virulent strains. The vaccine's inability to prevent infection and transmission allows the spread of highly virulent strains among vaccinated chickens. The fitness of the more virulent strains is increased by the vaccine.

The evolution of Marek's disease due to vaccination has had a profound effect on the poultry industry. Highly virulent strains have been selected to the point that any chicken that is unvaccinated will die if infected. Other leaky vaccines are commonly used in agriculture. One vaccine in particular is the vaccine for avian influenza. Leaky vaccine use for avian influenza can select for virulent strains.
