= Gallid herpesvirus 3 =

Virus classification
- (unranked): Virus
- Realm: Duplodnaviria
- Kingdom: Heunggongvirae
- Phylum: Peploviricota
- Class: Herviviricetes
- Order: Herpesvirales
- Family: Orthoherpesviridae
- Genus: Mardivirus
- Species: Mardivirus gallidalpha3

Synonyms
- Gallid alphaherpesvirus 3; Gallid herpesvirus 3

Species of virus

Gallid herpesvirus 3 (GaHV-3) is a species of virus in the genus Mardivirus, subfamily Alphaherpesvirinae, family Orthoherpesviridae, and order Herpesvirales.
