= 2,3-Bis(acetylmercaptomethyl)quinoxaline =

Names
- Preferred IUPAC name S,S′-[Quinoxaline-2,3-diylbis(methylene)] diethanethioate

Identifiers
CAS Number	36014-40-1
3D model (JSmol)	Interactive image
ChemSpider	163612
PubChem CID	188227
UNII	8D6GD5CB5H
CompTox Dashboard (EPA)	DTXSID50957434
- InChI: InChI=1S/C14H14N2O2S2/c1-9(17)19-7-13-14(8-20-10(2)18)16-12-6-4-3-5-11(12)15-13/h3-6H,7-8H2,1-2H3 Key: KIYGADXCTZZZDG-UHFFFAOYSA-N; InChI=1/C14H14N2O2S2/c1-9(17)19-7-13-14(8-20-10(2)18)16-12-6-4-3-5-11(12)15-13/h3-6H,7-8H2,1-2H3 Key: KIYGADXCTZZZDG-UHFFFAOYAA
- SMILES: CC(=O)SCC1=NC2=CC=CC=C2N=C1CSC(=O)C

Properties
Chemical formula	C_{14}H_{14}N_{2}O_{2}S_{2}
Molar mass	306.40 g·mol^{−1}
- Except where otherwise noted, data are given for materials in their standard state (at 25 °C [77 °F], 100 kPa). Infobox references

2,3-Bis(acetylmercaptomethyl)quinoxaline (BAMMQ) is an antiviral agent which inhibits poliovirus RNA synthesis in vitro and in vivo and inhibits human herpesvirus 1 multiplication in vitro. It does not interfere with attachment, penetration or DNA synthesis, but interrupts a late stage in virus assembly and/or maturation.

BAMMQ was first identified as an antiviral agent in 1974, when it was shown to inhibit poliovirus growth by 99.8% or more at concentrations as low as 10^{−5} M. That same year, a patent was filed for BAMMQ and related quinoxaline compounds as antiviral agents, particularly noting their effectiveness against herpes simplex virus. The compound acts by specifically inhibiting viral RNA synthesis, with inhibition occurring within 30–60 minutes after addition of the drug. Studies demonstrated that while BAMMQ inhibited viral RNA replication, it did not directly affect viral protein synthesis. The compound's antiviral activity was found to be somewhat dependent on the culture medium composition and viral infection levels. This initial research also suggested that BAMMQ may act by preventing the reinitiation of viral RNA synthesis rather than blocking ongoing RNA synthesis.

BAMMQ has demonstrated broad-spectrum antiviral activity against multiple viruses. In addition to poliovirus, early studies showed it was effective against vesicular stomatitis virus, human parainfluenza virus type 3, Rous sarcoma virus, and herpes simplex virus. However, the compound's basic cytotoxicity and the fact that its antiviral efficiency could be partly reversed by increasing viral infection levels or using enriched medium limited its practical applications. The compound has also shown activity against plant viruses. It effectively inhibits both tobacco mosaic virus (TMV) and cowpea chlorotic mottle virus (CCMV) at relatively low concentrations, requiring only 0.015 millimolar (mM) for 90% inhibition of TMV and 0.03 mM for CCMV in leaf disk experiments. While the compound shows promise in leaf disk studies, research has shown that it does not reduce TMV accumulation in tobacco tissue cultures containing the compound.

BAMMQ has also been studied as an inhibitor of encephalomyocarditis (EMC) virus. While it allowed plating of high virus concentrations without causing extensive cell damage, no resistant viral mutants were observed in these studies.
