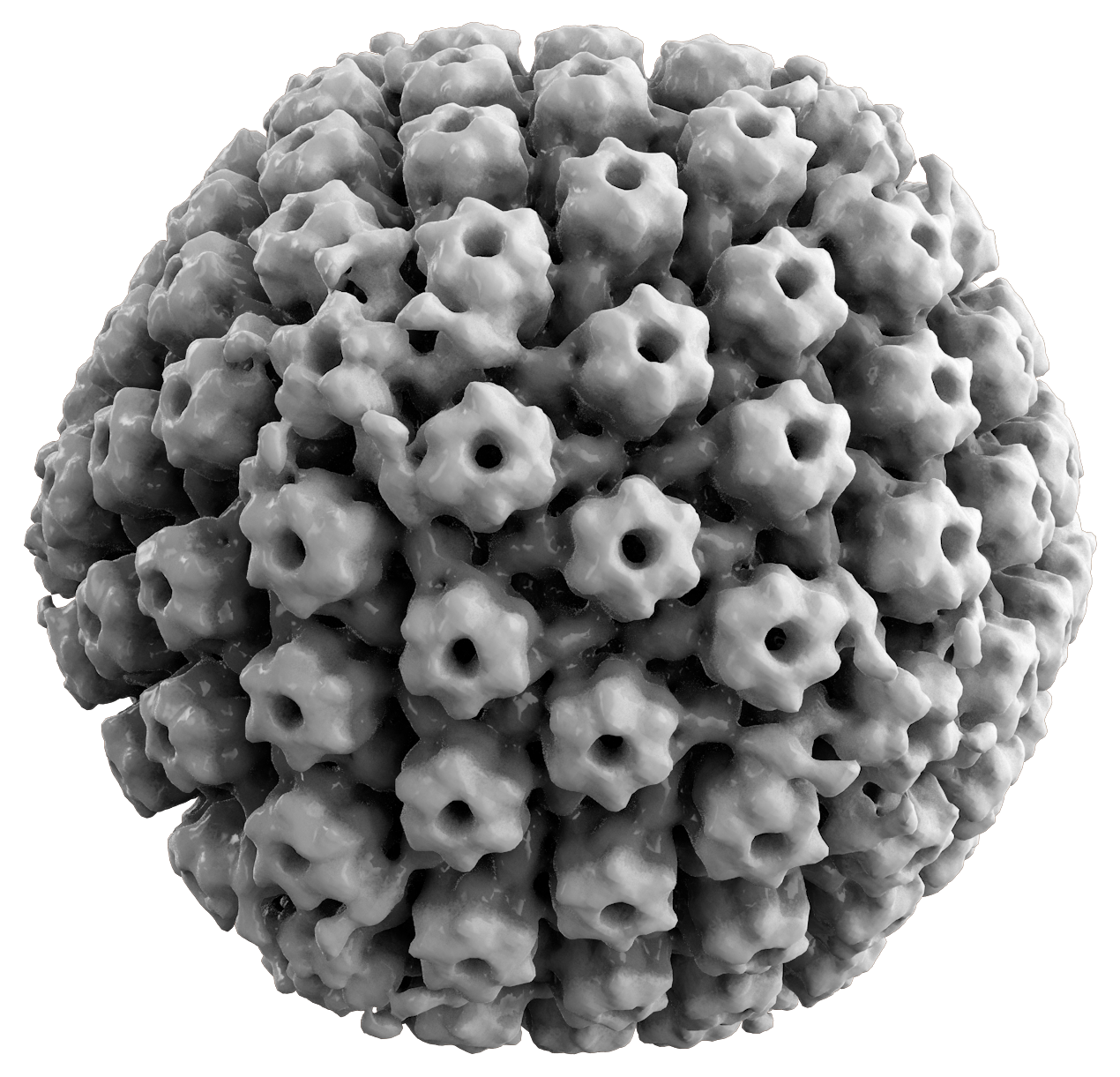
- 3D computer reconstruction of capsid

Virus classification
- (unranked): Virus
- Realm: Duplodnaviria
- Kingdom: Heunggongvirae
- Phylum: Peploviricota
- Class: Herviviricetes
- Order: Herpesvirales
- Family: Orthoherpesviridae
- Genus: Simplexvirus
- Species: Simplexvirus humanalpha1

Synonyms
- Human alphaherpesvirus 1; Herpes simplex virus 1

= Herpes simplex virus 1 =

Species of virus

Herpes simplex virus 1 (HHV-1 or HSV-1) is a species of virus in the genus Simplexvirus, subfamily Alphaherpesvirinae, family Herpesviridae, and order Herpesvirales.

== Evolution ==
Herpes simplex virus 1 can be classified into six clades. Four of these occur in East Africa, one in East Asia and one in Europe and North America. This suggests that the virus may have originated in East Africa. The most recent common ancestor of the Eurasian strains appears to have evolved around 60,000 years ago.

== Pathology ==
Herpes simplex virus 1 infects humans, most often as cold sores. It is very common and contagious; about 67% of the world population under the age of 50 has Herpes simplex virus 1. It is often acquired orally during childhood. It may also be sexually transmitted, including contact with saliva, such as kissing and mouth-to-genital contact (oral sex). The virus tends to reside in the trigeminal ganglia. This species appears to be particularly damaging to the nervous system, and some research has attributed Herpes simplex virus 1 infection to an increased risk of developing Alzheimer's disease. The virus interacts with the components and receptors of lipoproteins, which may lead to the development of Alzheimer's disease. However, evidence for a relationship with Alzheimer's disease is mixed. In 2011 Manchester University scientists showed that treating infected cells with antiviral agents decreased the accumulation of β-amyloid and tau protein, and also decreased replication of the virus.

== See also ==
- 2,3-Bis(acetylmercaptomethyl)quinoxaline, an antiviral agent against HHV-1
- Human alphaherpesvirus 2
