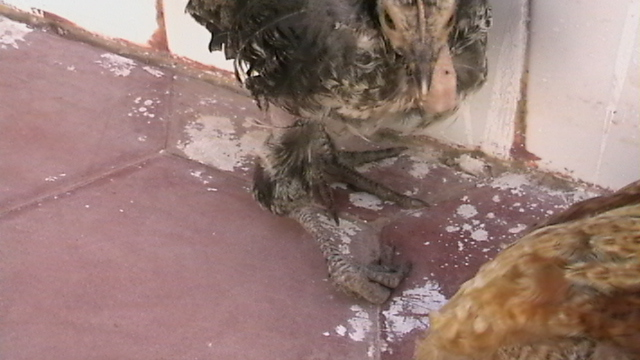
- Bird afflicted by Marek's disease virus

Virus classification
- (unranked): Virus
- Realm: Duplodnaviria
- Kingdom: Heunggongvirae
- Phylum: Peploviricota
- Class: Herviviricetes
- Order: Herpesvirales
- Family: Orthoherpesviridae
- Subfamily: Alphaherpesvirinae
- Genus: Mardivirus

Species
- See text

Synonyms
- Marek's disease-like viruses

= Mardivirus =

Genus of viruses

Mardivirus is a genus of viruses in the order Herpesvirales, in the family Orthoherpesviridae, in the subfamily Alphaherpesvirinae. Chickens, turkeys, and quail serve as natural hosts. There are six species in this genus. Diseases associated with this genus include: Marek's disease, which causes asymmetric paralysis of one or more limbs, neurological symptoms, and development of multiple lymphomas that manifest as solid tumors. Gallid herpesvirus 2 (also known as Marek's disease virus) is the only one of these viruses known to be pathogenic and due to the antigenic similarity between the three viruses the other two have been used to vaccinate against Marek's disease. These viruses have double stranded DNA genomes with no RNA intermediate.

== Species ==
The genus consists of the following species, listed by scientific name and followed by the common name of the species:

- Mardivirus anatidalpha1, Duck enteritis virus
- Mardivirus columbidalpha1, Columbid herpesvirus 1
- Mardivirus gallidalpha2, Marek's disease virus
- Mardivirus gallidalpha3, Gallid herpesvirus 3
- Mardivirus meleagridalpha1, Meleagrid herpesvirus 1
- Mardivirus spheniscidalpha1, Spheniscid alphaherpesvirus 1

== Structure ==
Viruses in Mardivirus are enveloped, with icosahedral, spherical to pleomorphic, and round geometries, and T=16 symmetry. The diameter is around 120–200 nm. Genomes are linear and non-segmented, around 175kb in length.

Genus	Structure	Symmetry	Capsid	Genomic arrangement	Genomic segmentation
Mardivirus	Spherical pleomorphic	T=16	Enveloped	Linear	Monopartite

== Life cycle ==
Viral replication is nuclear, and is lysogenic. Entry into the host cell is achieved by attachment of the viral gB, gC, gD and gH proteins to host receptors, which mediates endocytosis. Replication follows the dsDNA bidirectional replication model. DNA-templated transcription, with some alternative splicing mechanism is the method of transcription. The virus exits the host cell by nuclear egress, and budding. Chickens, turkeys, and quail serve as the natural host.

Genus	Host details	Tissue tropism	Entry details	Release details	Replication site	Assembly site	Transmission
Mardivirus	Chickens; turkeys; quail	None	Cell receptor endocytosis	Budding	Nucleus	Nucleus	Aerosol

== Replication ==
The stages of replication are similar to other viruses in Alphaherpesvirinae, but there are a few differences. After the virus has entered the cell the nucleocapsids make their way to a nuclear pore where the virus genome is released and translocates into the nucleus. The virus genome replicates and is packaged up within the nucleus, this new nucleocapsid then buds from the inner nuclear membrane and so gains its primary envelope. The nucleocapsid is now in the perinuclear space in the endoplasmic reticulum, from here the nucleocapsid buds from the outer nuclear membrane and by an unknown mechanism loses its primary envelope leaving the nucleocapsid naked in the cytoplasm. The nucleocapsids finally gain their secondary envelopes by budding into cytoplasmic vesicles within the cell.
