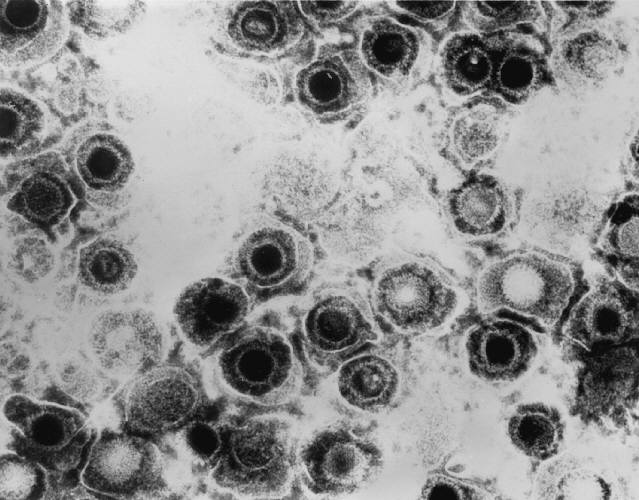
- Transmission electron micrograph of herpes simplex virus

Virus classification
- (unranked): Virus
- Realm: Duplodnaviria
- Kingdom: Heunggongvirae
- Phylum: Peploviricota
- Class: Herviviricetes
- Order: Herpesvirales
- Family: Orthoherpesviridae
- Genus: Simplexvirus
- Species: Simplexvirus humanalpha2

Synonyms
- Human alphaherpesvirus 2; Herpes simplex virus 2

= Herpes simplex virus 2 =

Species of virus

Herpes simplex virus 2 (HHV-2 or HSV-2) is a species of virus in the genus Simplexvirus, subfamily Alphaherpesvirinae, family Herpesviridae, and order Herpesvirales.

== Evolution ==
Herpes simplex virus 2 can be divided into two clades: one is globally distributed and the other is mostly limited to sub Saharan Africa.

The globally distributed genotype has evidently undergone four major recombinations at various times throughout history with herpes simplex 1. It has also been reported that HSV-1 and HSV-2 can have contemporary and stable recombination events in any hosts simultaneously infected with both pathogenic viral species. All of the recorded cases are HSV-2 acquiring parts of the HSV-1 genome, sometimes changing parts of its antigen epitope in the process.

== Pathology ==
Herpes simplex virus 2 infects humans, most often as genital herpes. In the United States more than one in six people have the virus. It is primarily a sexually transmitted infection. Herpes simplex virus 2 tends to reside in the sacral ganglia. Herpes simplex virus 2 is periodically shed in the human genital tract, most often asymptomatically. Most sexual transmissions occur during periods of asymptomatic shedding. Asymptomatic reactivation means that the virus causes atypical, subtle, or hard-to-notice symptoms that are not identified as an active herpes infection, so acquiring the virus is possible even if no active blisters or sores are present.

In one study, daily genital swab samples found Herpes simplex virus 2 at a median of 12–28% of days among those who have had an outbreak, and 10% of days among those suffering from asymptomatic infection, with many of these episodes occurring without visible outbreak ("subclinical shedding"). In another study, 73 subjects were randomized to receive valaciclovir 1 g daily or placebo for 60 days each in a two-way crossover design. A daily swab of the genital area was self-collected for Herpes simplex virus 2 detection by polymerase chain reaction, to compare the effect of valaciclovir versus placebo on asymptomatic viral shedding in immunocompetent, seropositive subjects without a history of symptomatic genital herpes infection. The study found that valaciclovir significantly reduced shedding during subclinical days compared to placebo, showing a 71% reduction; 84% of subjects had no shedding while receiving valaciclovir versus 54% of subjects on placebo. About 88% of patients treated with valaciclovir had no recognized signs or symptoms versus 77% for placebo. For Herpes simplex virus 2, subclinical shedding may account for most of the transmission. Studies on discordant partners (one infected, one not) show that the transmission rate is approximately 5 per 10,000 sexual contacts. Atypical symptoms are often attributed to other causes, such as a yeast infection.

== See also ==
- Human alphaherpesvirus 1
