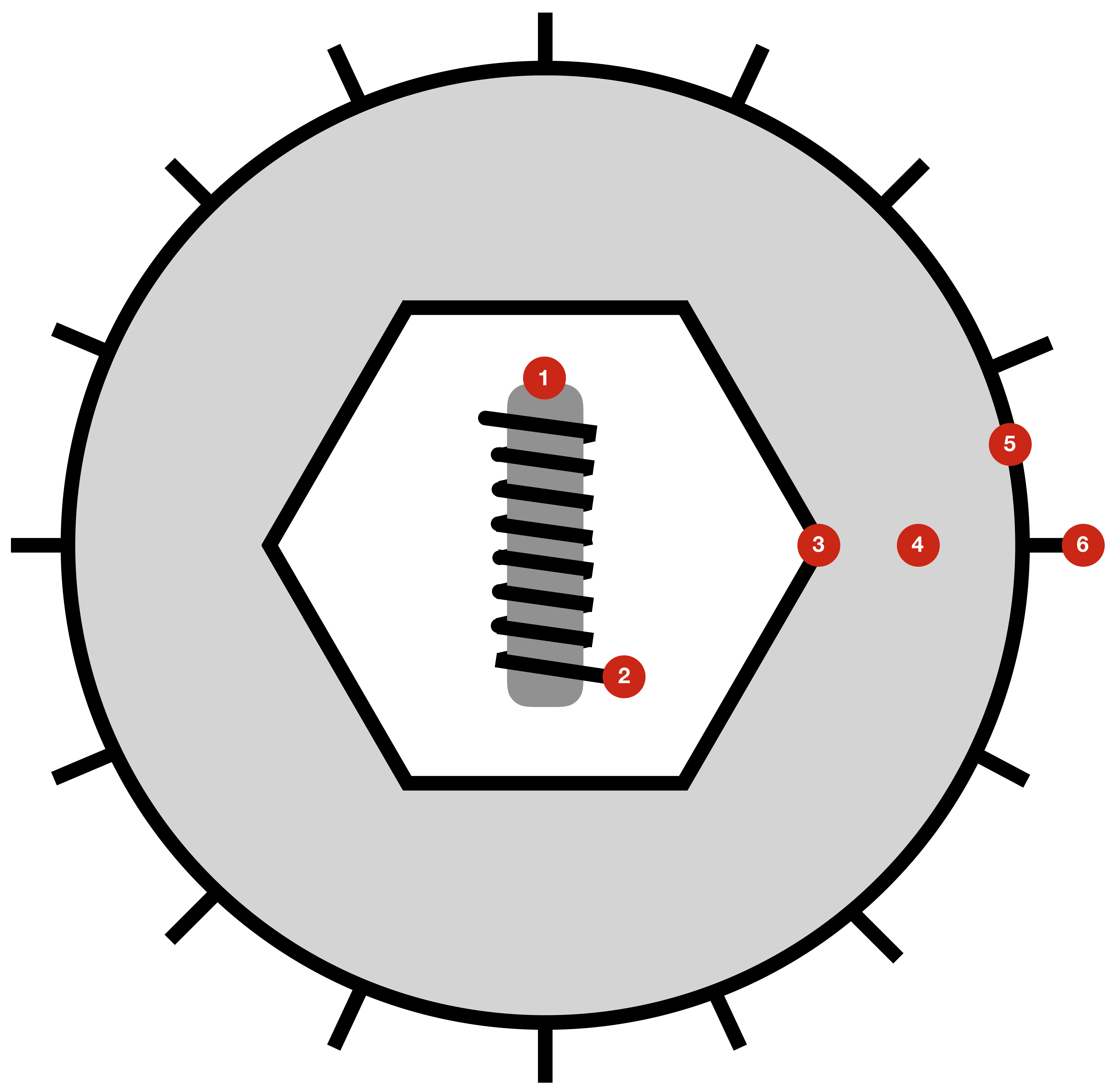
- Simplified diagram of Herpesvirales virion structure in cross-section. (1) nucleoprotein, (2) DNA, (3) capsid, (4) tegument, (5) envelope, (6) glycoprotein. Click to enlarge.
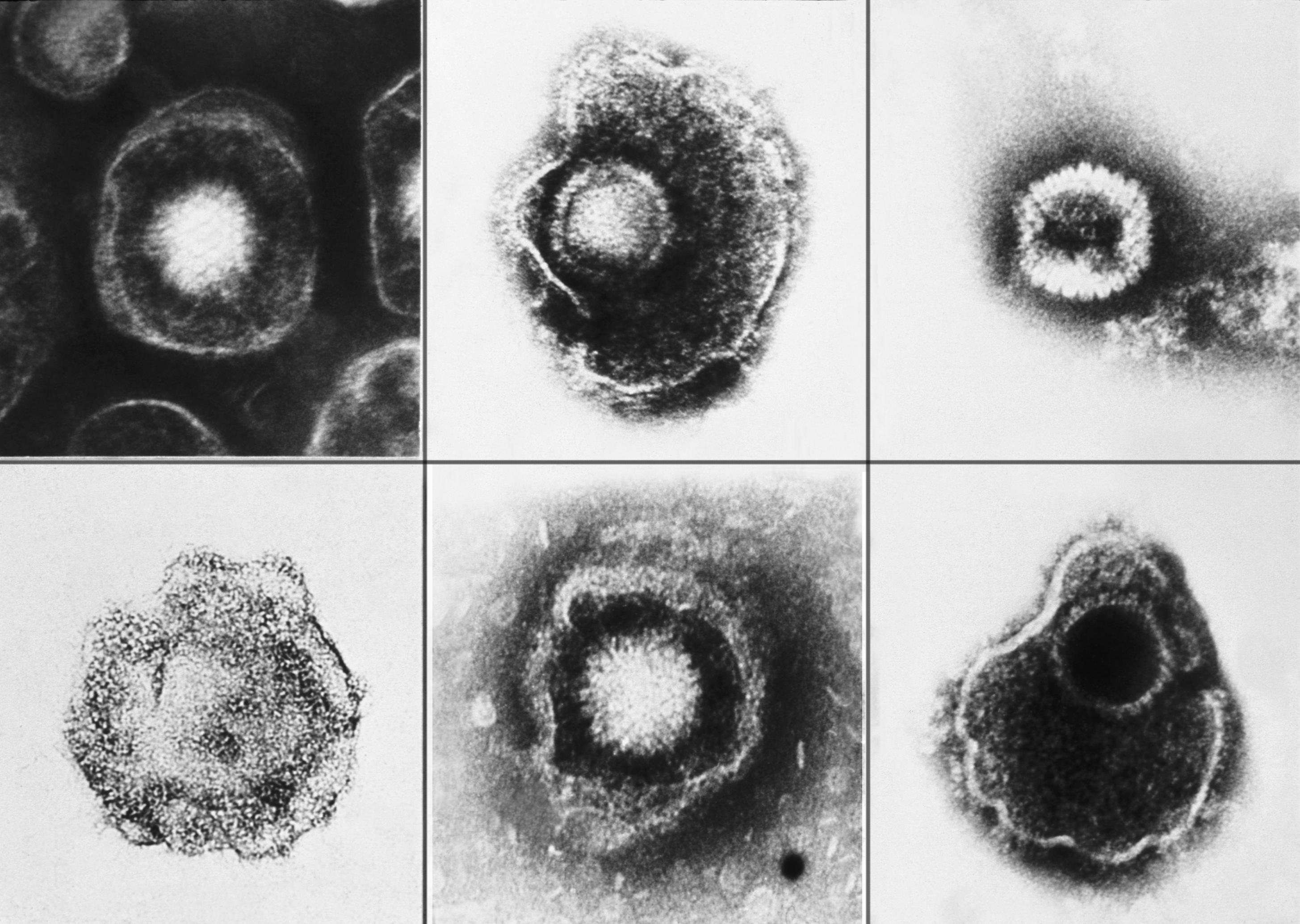
- Electron micrograph of various viruses from the Orthoherpesviridae family including Human alphaherpesvirus 3 (Chickenpox), Human alphaherpesvirus 1, and Human alphaherpesvirus 2

Virus classification
- (unranked): Virus
- Realm: Duplodnaviria
- Kingdom: Heunggongvirae
- Phylum: Peploviricota
- Class: Herviviricetes
- Order: Herpesvirales

Families
- Alloherpesviridae; Malacoherpesviridae; Orthoherpesviridae

= Herpesvirales =

Order of viruses

Herpesvirales is an order of dsDNA viruses (Baltimore group I) with animal hosts, characterised by a common morphology consisting of an icosahedral capsid enclosed in a glycoprotein-containing lipid envelope. Common infections in humans caused by members of this order include cold sores, genital herpes, chickenpox, shingles, and glandular fever. Herpesvirales is the sole order in the class Herviviricetes, which is the sole class in the phylum Peploviricota.

== Virology ==
=== Morphology ===
All members of the order have a virion structure that consists of a DNA core surrounded by an icosahedral capsid composed of 12 pentavalent and 150 hexavalent capsomeres (T = 16). The capsid has a diameter of ~110 nanometers (nm) and is embedded in a proteinaceous matrix called the tegument, which in its turn is enclosed by a glycoprotein-containing lipid envelope with a diameter of about 200 nm. The DNA genome is linear and double stranded, with sizes in the range 125–290 kbp. The genome contains terminal and internal reiterated sequences, with their number and disposition varying depending on the different subclades.

=== Hosts ===
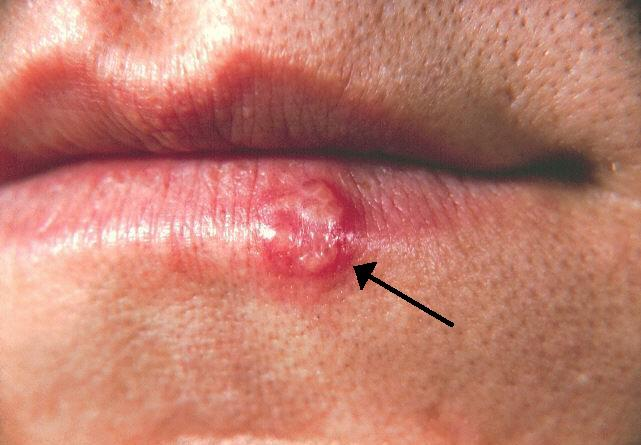
A cold sore

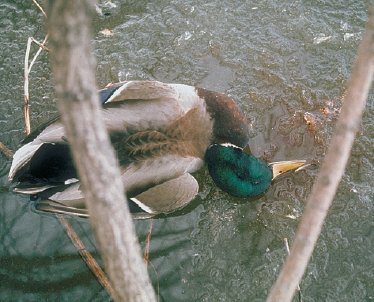
Herpesviruses may be highly virulent in some species. This dying mallard infected with Duck enteritis virus is emitting a bloody nasal discharge on the ice.

All species in this order have animal hosts. The Malacoherpesviridae infect molluscs (abalone and oysters), the Alloherpesviridae infect anamniotes (frogs and fish), and the Herpesviridae infect amniotes (reptiles, birds, and mammals). Within the family Herpesviridae, genera Iltovirus and Mardivirus, and genus Scutavirus of the subfamily Alphaherpesvirinae infect birds and reptiles, respectively. All other genera in the Herpesviridae infect mammals only.

== Taxonomy ==
Herpesvirales contains three families:

- Alloherpesviridae
- Malacoherpesviridae
- Orthoherpesviridae

=== History ===
The herpesvirus was first isolated from the blue wildebeest in 1960 by veterinary scientist Walter Plowright. The genus Herpesvirus was established in 1971 in the first report of the International Committee on Taxonomy of Viruses (ICTV). This genus consisted of 23 viruses and 4 groups of viruses. In the second ICTV report in 1976 this genus was elevated to family level - the Herpetoviridae. Because of possible confusion with viruses derived from reptiles this name was changed in the third report in 1979 to Herpesviridae. In this report the family Herpesviridae was divided into 3 subfamilies (Alphaherpesvirinae, Betaherpesvirinae and Gammaherpesvirinae) and 5 unnamed genera: 21 viruses were listed. In 2009 the family Herpesviridae was elevated to the order Herpesvirales. This elevation was necessitated by the discovery that the herpesviruses of fish and molluscs were only distantly related to those of birds and mammals. Two new families were created - the family Alloherpesviridae which incorporates bony fish and frog viruses and the family Malacoherpesviridae which contains those of molluscs.

=== Phylogenetics ===
The only protein with widespread conservation amongst all members of the order, albeit only at the amino-acid level, is the ATPase subunit of the DNA terminase; the latter is involved in the packaging of the DNA during virion assembly.

Phylogenies constructed with the conserved regions of the ATPase subunit of the DNA terminase suggest that Alloherpesviridae is the basal clade of the order, and that Herpesviridae and Malacoherpesviridae are sister clades.
