= Cyprinid herpesvirus 1 =

Virus classification
- (unranked): Virus
- Realm: Duplodnaviria
- Kingdom: Heunggongvirae
- Phylum: Peploviricota
- Class: Herviviricetes
- Order: Herpesvirales
- Family: Alloherpesviridae
- Genus: Cyvirus
- Species: Cyvirus cyprinidallo1

Synonyms
- Cyprinid herpesvirus 1; CyHV1

Species of virus

Cyprinid herpesvirus 1 (CyHV1) is a species of virus in the genus Cyvirus, family Alloherpesviridae, and order Herpesvirales.

CyHV1 causes carp pox, also known as epithelioma papillosum in common carp (Cyprinus carpio). Cases of CyHV1 are found worldwide and the observed symptoms as a result of infection are both systemic and highly lethal. Evaluations of virus production in relation to temperature demonstrated temperature's influence on pathogenicity and replication. This, combined with CyHV1's high mortality rate, may have implications on the common carp population as water temperatures warm with increasing global temperatures.

== Background ==
Although the symptoms that appear in common carp as a result of CyHV1 have been noted for centuries, the virus was only isolated and classified as a herpesvirus in 1985. It is the first of the Cyprinid herpesviruses to be discovered. Viral etiology dates back to 1907, however, isolation was not successful until 1985. CyHV1 has yet to be cultured, likely because of host and tissue specificity associated with most herpesviruses.

== Genome ==
Whole genome sequencing revealed that the Cyprinid herpesvirus 1 genome is approximately 291,144 bp, however, this number may be variable due to tandem reiterations. Heterogeneous genome size is often observed in other species of herpesviruses. These short yet complex tandem reiterations are most often seen in the terminal direct repeats; the most prevalent being the telomere-like repeats located towards the genome ends. Although this is characteristic of all Cyvirus species, the telomere-like repeats are the biggest in CyHV1.

The CyHV1 virus has approximately 143 open reading frames (ORFs) in the genome and splicing between protein-coding regions affects 8 of these ORFs. Five gene families have been identified. CyHV1 has multiple genes from each of the ORF2, TNFR, ORF25, RING, and JUNB families. The JUNB family is not seen in other species of Cyvirus and is the first reported JUNB-related sequence found in herpesviruses. JUNB is an oncogene, which may play a role in tumour development as a result of infection with CyHV1.

== Pathology ==
There appear to be two systemic phases of infection, acute and recurring. The initial acute phase is lethal, and survivors often experience the recurring, non-lethal proliferative epidermal phase.

Common carp infected with Cyprinid herpesvirus 1 have been shown to exhibit atypical swimming behaviours, protrusion of the eyes from their cavities, darkening of the skin, and hemorrhaging across the body and the operculum. In the fish that were approaching death, they were observed to have tissue death in the liver, kidney, and intestines. Some of the necrotic cells had been observed to have Cowdry Type A intranuclear inclusion bodies. Infection is more commonly characterized by epidermal tumour growths and hyperplasia.
