= Anguillid herpesvirus 1 =

Virus classification
- (unranked): Virus
- Realm: Duplodnaviria
- Kingdom: Heunggongvirae
- Phylum: Peploviricota
- Class: Herviviricetes
- Order: Herpesvirales
- Family: Alloherpesviridae
- Genus: Cyvirus
- Species: Cyvirus anguillidallo1

Synonyms
- Anguillid herpesvirus 1; AngHV1

Species of virus

Anguillid herpesvirus 1 (AngHV1) is a species of virus in the genus Cyvirus, family Alloherpesviridae, and order Herpesvirales.

AngHV1 has been known to infect several freshwater eel species, such as the Japanese eel (Anguilla japonica), European eel (A. anguilla), and more recently the American eel (A. rostrata), the Indonesian shortfin eel (A. bicolor), and the Giant mottled eel (A. marmorata). Because the isolates from European and Japanese eels are similar in both their genetics and their host's antibody response, the virus is considered to be a single species. The morbidity of AngHV1 is relatively high, and although mortality rates are usually low, it can be significantly increased when infection is coupled with secondary infections. This virus is threatening to farmed and wild eel species worldwide.

== Background ==
The first discovery and isolation of AngHV1 was achieved in 1990 by researchers from the Tokyo University of Fisheries located in Tokyo, Japan. This sparked interest in the late 80s after Japanese eels and European eels being farmed in recirculation systems suffered from a significant increase in mortality.^{[2][3]} Around the same time frame, a similar loss of population as a result of herpesvirus was observed in Europe. Isolation of the virus in Europe was not achieved until the importation of a susceptible eel kidney (EK-1) cell line in 1998, when it was then classified as AngHV1.

== Genome ==
Whole genome sequencing of this enveloped double-stranded DNA virus revealed that it has a genome length of 249,121 bp, which is the smallest genome in comparison to the other members of the Cyvirus genus. AngHV1 also has a pair of 11-kb terminal direct repeats as well as 133 protein-coding open reading frames (ORFs). Isolates from the DNA-polymerase encoding gene from A. rostrata in Canada were phylogenetically analyzed and compared to the genes from AngHV1 infecting other eel species, revealing that they are identical. Analysis of gDNA in A. rostrata showed a near identical composition to that isolated from both A. japonica and A. anguilla. This leads to the inference that there is low genetic diversity within the isolated strains of Anguillid herpesvirus 1, despite the range of hosts and their distribution being widespread. This is uncommon for herpesviruses, which typically exhibit strong host specificity.

== Pathology ==
Eels of all ages are subject to viral infection by Anguillid herpesvirus 1. Externally, infected eels usually exhibit hemorrhaging on their fins and skin. However, because these symptoms are non-specific in eels, diagnosis can be difficult as two other RNA viruses, Eel virus European (EVE) and Eel virus European X (EVEX) produce similar external pathology. Histopathology associated with AngHV1 includes a combination of cell death on the skin, liver, and lamellae, as well as gill hyperplasia and lamellar fusion.

== Prevention ==
Because of the low species specificity observed with AngHV1, there is a strong need for a vaccine. Vaccines are reportedly among the most effective approaches when it comes to prevention and controlling the spread of the virus. As of 2024, there have been no reports of vaccines available to treat the disease. However, a formalin-inactivated vaccine has been tested on American eels and was shown to exhibit increased survival as well as lower incidence rates. In American eels, this vaccine is shown to be safe when administered through intramuscular injection in the back. However, the vaccine has not been tested or proven effective on other species of eel that AngHV1 infects.
