= Cyprinid herpesvirus 2 =

Virus classification
- (unranked): Virus
- Realm: Duplodnaviria
- Kingdom: Heunggongvirae
- Phylum: Peploviricota
- Class: Herviviricetes
- Order: Herpesvirales
- Family: Alloherpesviridae
- Genus: Cyvirus
- Species: Cyvirus cyprinidallo2

Synonyms
- Cyprinid herpesvirus 2; CyHV2

Species of virus

Cyprinid herpesvirus 2 (CyHV2) is a species of virus in the genus Cyvirus, family Alloherpesviridae, and order Herpesvirales.

CyHV2 can also be classified as herpesviral hematopoietic necrosis virus (HVHN) and infects goldfish (Carassius auratus) of all ages. It can also infect the closely related species, Prussian Carp (C. gibelio) however koi and goldfish hybrids cannot be infected by CyHV2. Outbreaks have been reported in both cultured and wild populations, and are highly lethal.

== Background ==
Jung and Miyazaki (1995) were the first to describe CyHV2 in Japan. This was achieved via isolation from moribund goldfish after the epizootic disease was observed in 1992 and 1993. Culture of HVHN was unsuccessful until 2007.

== Genome ==
Whole genome sequencing revealed that the CyHV2 genome is 290,304 bp in size. This number may be variable due to tandem reiterations. Heterogeneous genome size is often observed in other species of herpesviruses. These short yet complex tandem reiterations are most often seen in the terminal direct repeats; the most prevalent being the telomere-like repeats located towards the genome ends. In comparison to the other viruses, the CyHV2 genome is the most complex in terms of the unique regions plus one copy of terminal direct repeats.

HVHN has approximately 154 open reading frames (ORFs) and splicing between protein-coding regions affects 9 of these ORFs. Five gene families have been identified. This included multiple genes from TNFR, ORF2, ORF25, RING, and ORF153, as well as ORF22, which is present as a family of two.

== Pathology ==
External symptoms of fish impacted with CyHV2 typically show pale patches localized at the gills but do not exhibit lesions. Fish with this infection also appeared to be lethargic, anorexic, and exhibited a loss of appetite. CyHV2 is more often characterized by internal symptoms such as an enlarged kidney and spleen, as well as pallor of the kidney. Histopathology of infected goldfish has revealed tissue death in the hematopoietic tissues in both the kidney and the splenic pulp. Necrosis was also observed in the pancreas. Smaller, more scattered tissue death and swelling was also observed in the lamina propria as well as the submucosa of the intestine.

At this time, disease prevention is mainly achieved by avoidance. A formalin-inactivated vaccine developed in 2015 was effective against goldfish infected with HVHN, however, as of now, there is not an established timeline that discusses the duration of protection.
