= Epizootic epitheliotropic disease virus =

Virus classification
- (unranked): Virus
- Realm: Duplodnaviria
- Kingdom: Heunggongvirae
- Phylum: Peploviricota
- Class: Herviviricetes
- Order: Herpesvirales
- Family: Alloherpesviridae
- Genus: Salmovirus
- Species: Salmovirus salmonidallo3

Synonyms
- Epizootic epitheliotrophic disease virus; Salmonid herpesvirus 3; SalHV3

Species of virus

Epizootic epitheliotrophic disease virus (EEDV), also called Salmonid herpesvirus 3 (SalHV3), is a species of virus in the genus Salmovirus, family Alloherpesviridae, and order Herpesvirales. The virus causes epizootic epitheliotrophic disease (EED), first described in 1989.

EEDV affects lake trout (Salvelinus namaycush), resulting in several mass mortality events over the years.

== Background ==
The virus was initially identified in 1988 when investigating the cause behind the mass mortalities of cultured juvenile lake trout within two hatcheries located in the Great Lakes region of the United States. By the end of the 1980s, 15 million lake trout had died due to the virus in the Laurentian Great Lakes Basin. Hatcheries removed the infected fish and heavily sanitized the contaminated areas in order to prevent further spread of the virus. However, a northern Michigan hatchery experienced two outbreaks in 2012 and 2017, resulting in the loss of approximately 100,000 lake trout, indicating that the threat of EEDV is still present, possibly due to infected wild lake trout being introduced to the hatcheries for breeding.

== Pathology ==
EEDV has been found to target skin cells more than other external and internal tissue of the fish. In the early stages of infection, the cells of the epithelium are most affected, while gills harbour less copies of the virus than other external areas of the body. Viral DNA has not been found to be present in the internal organs until at least two weeks post-infection. As the disease progresses, the skin of the fish is shed, leading researchers to believe the ulcerated, necrotic tissue of infected fish being the primary source of infection to neighbouring fish. Skin, eye, and gill tissue contain a higher amount of virus-positive DNA than internal organ tissue throughout all stages of infection.

Clinical signs indicating infection of the virus include fin congestion, corneal opacity, skin lesions (including ulceration), gill pallor, and erythema.

PCR and qPCR assays have been developed in order to detect the presence of the virus during active viral outbreaks and latent states of infection in lake trout from kidney, skin, ovarian fluid. The earliest detection of the virus in infected fish was experimentally found to be by day 9.

== Treatment ==
There are currently no treatments or vaccines for EEDV, however prevention measures such as the usage of potassium peroxymonosulfate (PPMS)-based disinfectants on hatchery tools have been utilized to minimize loss of hatchery-raised lake trout.
