= Ranid herpesvirus 3 =

Virus classification
- (unranked): Virus
- Realm: Duplodnaviria
- Kingdom: Heunggongvirae
- Phylum: Peploviricota
- Class: Herviviricetes
- Order: Herpesvirales
- Family: Alloherpesviridae
- Genus: Batravirus
- Species: Batravirus ranidallo3

Synonyms
- Ranid herpesvirus 3; RaHV3

Species of virus

Ranid herpesvirus 3 (RaHV3) is a species of virus in the genus Batravirus, family Alloherpesviridae, and order Herpesvirales.
