= Ictalurid herpesvirus 2 =

Virus classification
- (unranked): Virus
- Realm: Duplodnaviria
- Kingdom: Heunggongvirae
- Phylum: Peploviricota
- Class: Herviviricetes
- Order: Herpesvirales
- Family: Alloherpesviridae
- Genus: Ictavirus
- Species: Ictavirus ictaluridallo2

Synonyms
- Black bullhead virus; Ictalurid herpesvirus 2; IcHV2

Species of virus

Ictalurid herpesvirus 2 (IcHV2) is a species of virus in the genus Ictavirus, family Alloherpesviridae, and order Herpesvirales.

Also known as the black bullhead virus, it is phylogenetically similar to IcHV1. Distinction between the two species is reliant on the places of detection and the severity of clinical signs. IcHV2 has been experimentally observed to result in more severe clinical signs in channel catfish than IcHV1.

== Background ==
IcHV2 was first observed in 1994 after two mass mortality events occurred in two different catfish farms in Italy, resulting in severe economic loss.

As observed in experimental trials, there is a higher mortality rate in channel catfish when exposed to IcHV2 than in trials and previous background studies where channel catfish were exposed to IcHV1. It is also shown that through syncytial cytopathic effect, both strains of Ictalurid herpesvirus are homologous to the syncytia produced.

== Genome ==
Next-generation sequencing performed on IcHV2 revealed its complete genome to be 142,925 bp, along with 77 (predicted) protein-coding regions with 12 open reading frames (ORFs) where these ORFs are seen to be homologous with every other Alloherpesvirus sequenced. High synteny between IcHV1 and IcHV2 was also observed.

== Diagnosis ==
Detection of IcHV2 uses quantitative PCR (qPCR) for any potential carriers or for checking for isolates. While IcHV2 was detected in all organs, the virus was seen the highest in the kidney and spleen; meanwhile, liver and gill concentrations were much lower.

Other uses of qPCR can help detect IcHV2 in latently infected carrier fish. This helps reduce the risk of potentially relocating the virus and introducing it into new aquaculture and whether or not high morbidity rates are from IcHV2 or another pathogen.

== Pathology ==
Clinical signs of IcHV2 include disoriented swimming or instances where they dwell at the surface of the pond bank. Other signs include scattered hemorrhages and kidney tissue death.

IcHV2 propagation control is a highly researched topic due to it showing much more intensive mortality rates in channel catfish than IcHV1. The high mortality rate is due to the fact that IcHV2 propagation and viral transmission has an optimal temperature of 24°C, which is relatively lower than IcHV1. Furthermore, overcrowded pens contribute to the transmission of the virus.
