= Salmonid herpesvirus 1 =

Virus classification
- (unranked): Virus
- Realm: Duplodnaviria
- Kingdom: Heunggongvirae
- Phylum: Peploviricota
- Class: Herviviricetes
- Order: Herpesvirales
- Family: Alloherpesviridae
- Genus: Salmovirus
- Species: Salmovirus salmonidallo1

Synonyms
- Herpesvirus salmonis; Salmonid herpesvirus 1; SalHV1

Species of virus

Salmonid herpesvirus 1 (SalHV1), also called Herpesvirus salmonis, is a species of virus in the genus Salmovirus, and family Alloherpesviridae.

It is known to infect the rainbow trout Oncorhynchus mykiss.

== Genome ==
The virus's genome is 174.4 kbp in size.
