= Channel catfish virus =

Virus classification
- (unranked): Virus
- Realm: Duplodnaviria
- Kingdom: Heunggongvirae
- Phylum: Peploviricota
- Class: Herviviricetes
- Order: Herpesvirales
- Family: Alloherpesviridae
- Genus: Ictavirus
- Species: Ictavirus ictaluridallo1

Synonyms
- Channel catfish virus (CCV); Ictalurid herpesvirus 1; IcHV-1

Species of virus

Channel catfish virus (CCV) is a species of virus in the genus Ictavirus, family Alloherpesviridae, and order Herpesvirales. It causes disease in channel catfish and blue catfish, and can cause significant economic loss in catfish farms. The disease is endemic in the USA and there are reports of the virus in Honduras and Russia.

It is known to cause channel catfish virus disease (CCVD), resulting in high mortality rates and reduction of growth in catfish. Occurrences of CCVD are often met with crowding and environmental stress. Factors in favor of the proliferation of CCVD include temperature, crowding, and age. Instances when this virus is reported are usually during warm summer months and in highly crowded catfish ponds–places where the virus can easily be transmitted amongst catfish–and in catfish that are less than a year old.

== Background ==
Although it was first isolated in 1968, the characterization of this virus was intensively studied in 1971. Classification of this virus as a herpesvirus began as evidence of characteristics similar to other species of the order were observed using electron microscopy, such as the presence of a viral envelope, assembly of the virus in the nucleus, and a small size (100 nm).

== Genome ==
Sequencing of the CCV has shown it to be similar to all other herpesviruses. Its double-stranded DNA structure of 134 kb encodes 79 genes responsible for the infection and spread of the virus. From previous research using liquid chromatography electrospray ionization tandem mass spectrometry (LC/ESI-MS/MS), 37 structural proteins are responsible for forming the shape of CCV where one of the structural proteins, ORF59, is responsible for viral transmission. This is because ORF59 codes for a hydrophobic envelope to encapsulate the virus in order for it to span across the lipid membrane into the host cell’s cytoplasm.

== Pathology ==
=== Clinical signs ===
Transmission is both horizontal and vertical. Reservoirs of disease are clinically affected fish and recovered covert carriers. Disease occurs in fish less than a year old that weigh less than 10 grams. The critical environmental factor is water temperature with the disease occurring during warm weather. Outbreaks are normally seen only in farmed fish. Affected fish have pot-bellied appearance, haemorrhages on the fins and musculature and exophthalmos. Affected fish seem off balance and tend to swim erratically or close to the surface, and eventually sinking to the bottom. Fish that survive the infection have lifelong protective immunity but remain latent carriers of the virus. This is a significant source of disease for vulnerable fish. Increased mortality in young catfish during warm weather, especially after stress, is suggestive of CCV.

=== Diagnosis ===
The virus can be detected in water containing infected fish and organs of diseased fish by virus neutralisation, fluorescent antibody testing, ELISA, or PCR. FAT and ELISA should be used for diagnosis of clinically infected fish while virus neutralisation or PCR should be used to detect carrier fish. Lesions are seen on the liver, kidney and many other internal organs both histologically and grossly on postmortem examination.

=== Treatment and control ===
There is no available treatment. Stress and high stocking-densities should be avoided to reduce disease occurrence. Appropriate quarantine and hygiene measures should be employed to prevent spread of disease. The virus is sensitive to acidic pH, heat, and UV light, and is inactivated by pond mud and sea water.

== Immunity ==
A catfish’s innate and adaptive immunity for CCV allows it to build resistance to it. This has been found through experimental introduction of CCV to recovering catfish that have been exposed to the virus after a season showing an immunity to the virus. However, the mechanism for this immunity is still uncertain.

There seem to be some observations for this immunity including species-specific natural killer cells where they are shown to kill CCV infected cells and through antibiotic responses where serum from CCVD survivors is injected to young catfish.
