= Ranid herpesvirus 2 =

Virus classification
- (unranked): Virus
- Realm: Duplodnaviria
- Kingdom: Heunggongvirae
- Phylum: Peploviricota
- Class: Herviviricetes
- Order: Herpesvirales
- Family: Alloherpesviridae
- Genus: Batravirus
- Species: Batravirus ranidallo2

Synonyms
- Ranid herpesvirus 2; RaHV-2

Species of virus

Ranid herpesvirus 2 (RaHV-2) is a species of virus in the genus Batrachovirus, family Alloherpesviridae, and order Herpesvirales.
