= Oncorhynchus masou virus =

Virus classification
- (unranked): Virus
- Realm: Duplodnaviria
- Kingdom: Heunggongvirae
- Phylum: Peploviricota
- Class: Herviviricetes
- Order: Herpesvirales
- Family: Alloherpesviridae
- Genus: Salmovirus
- Species: Salmovirus salmonidallo2

Synonyms
- Oncorhynchus masou virus; Salmonid herpesvirus 2; SalHV2

Species of virus

Oncorhynchus masou virus (OMV), also called Salmonid herpesvirus 2 (SalHV2), is a species of virus in the genus Salmovirus, family Alloherpesviridae, and order Herpesvirales. The virus causes Oncorhynchus masou virus disease (OMVD), first described in 1981.

== Background ==
The virus was first isolated in the ovarian fluid of masu salmon (Oncorhynchus masou) in 1971 from a hatchery in Hokkaido, Japan. In later studies, the virus has been found to be pathogenic and oncogenic to fish other than masu salmon, including coho salmon (O. kisutch), kokanee salmon (O. nerka), chum salmon (O. keta), and rainbow trout (O. mykiss), though the virus is still referred to by the species it was initially found to have infected. Salmonid herpesvirus 2 primarily affects such salmonid fish, both wild and farmed, in Japan, though it has been observed in Kuwait. Significant economic loss was suffered by the rainbow trout industry in Japan due to the virus, as the resulting disease affected many marketable-sized fish in 1992.

== Pathology ==
Susceptibility to the virus varies between species; species from most to least susceptible are as follows: kokanee salmon, chum salmon, masu salmon, coho salmon, and rainbow trout. Mortality rates also vary based on the age of the fish. In a 1983 study, researchers found that the rate of mortality of young salmon between 1-month and 5-months-of-age was above 80%, with mortality rates decreasing to less than 10% after 6-months-of-age.

Clinical signs include the appearance of ulcerated skin lesions, pale gills, darkening of the body surface, anorexia, lethargy, and neoplastic tissue on the exterior of the fish. Tumours may persist for up to a year after infection in surviving fish. However, some fish were found to show no external signs of Oncorhynchus masou virus disease despite infection. Internally, white and gray spots on the liver and intestines, and swelling of the liver and intestines have been observed.

Transmission of the virus is horizontal, and may be shed through skin, feces, urine, and sexual fluids. Both symptomatic and asymptomatic carriers are able to transmit the virus to others. Replication of the virus and its appearance has been found in the ovarian fluid of mature fish.

While surviving fish are not considered a threat to human health, they are considered unfit to be sold due to the presence of skin ulcers and cutaneous tumours.

== Treatment ==
OMV has been found to be sensitive to various treatments, such as ultraviolet irradiation and ozone and iodophor treatment. Preventative measures include testing ovarian fluid of mature fish within hatcheries, disinfection of fertilized eggs, and disinfection and iodophor treatment of affected facilities.
