= Acipenserid herpesvirus 2 =

Virus classification
- (unranked): Virus
- Realm: Duplodnaviria
- Kingdom: Heunggongvirae
- Phylum: Peploviricota
- Class: Herviviricetes
- Order: Herpesvirales
- Family: Alloherpesviridae
- Genus: Ictavirus
- Species: Ictavirus acipenseridallo2

Synonyms
- Acipenserid herpesvirus 2; AciHV2; White sturgeon herpesvirus 2

Species of virus

Acipenserid herpesvirus 2 (AciHV2) is a species of virus in the genus Ictavirus, family Alloherpesviridae, and order Herpesvirales. It infects sturgeon of the family Acipenseridae.

== Background ==
Initial isolation of the virus came from the ovarian fluid of healthy adult sturgeon. Further isolation of the virus came in the form of skin lesions from subadult sturgeons which underwent high levels of morbidity and mortality.

== Genome ==
Genomic sequencing of the species shows similarities with other species in genus Ictavirus even though host species are different for the species and other viral species in the genus. AciHV2 is a novel virus for sturgeon. Whole-genome sequencing found it to have around 134 kb and quantitative PCR found it to have low homology with other such pathogens.

Gene structure of AciHV2 shows high degrees of synteny with IcHV1. BlastX programs for showing similarities between gene sequences between AciHV2 and IcHV1 each counterpart for each gene sequence for open reading frames in the respective species showed a counterpart to the other.

== Pathology ==
High mortality rates for sturgeons was accompanied by erratic swimming and skin lesions. Hemorrhaging has also been observed along with necrosis in the kidney, spleen and liver. Characteristics to herpesvirus showed sturgeon with skin lesions which eventually lead to necrosis. Lesions were only seen on the external side of the fish with no evidence of lesions internally in the main organs.

AciHV2 had several episodes of epizootics.
