= Nogoi =

Japanese wild-type common carp

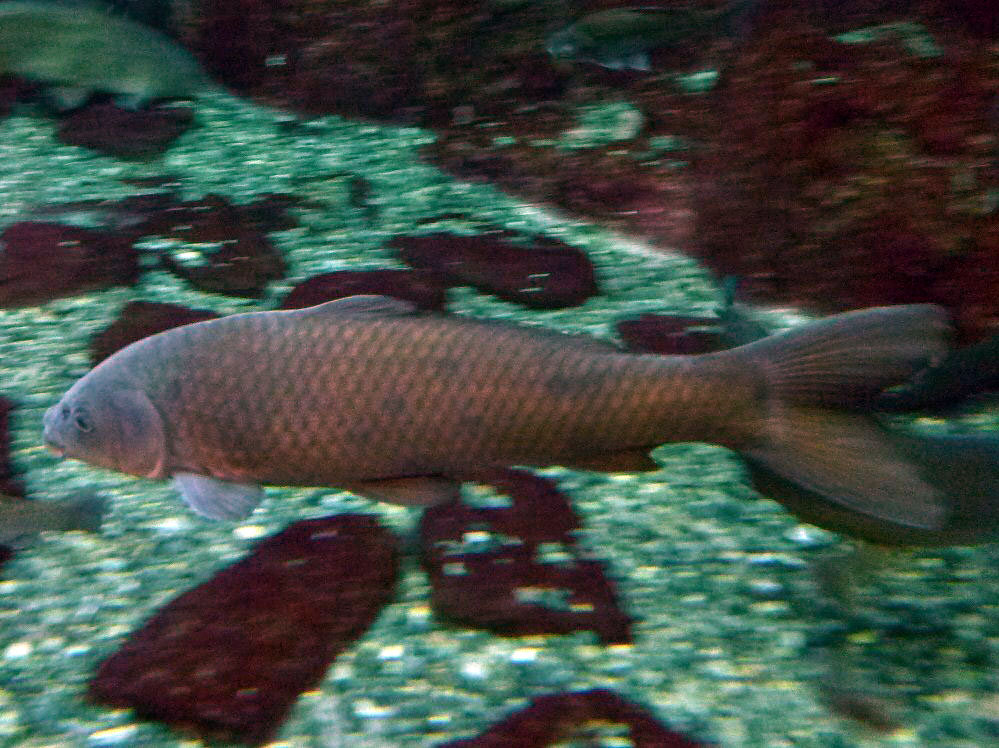
A wild-type common carp kept at the Lake Biwa Museum in Shiga Prefecture

Nogoi (野鯉; literally "wild carp") is a Japanese term for wild-type common carp occurring in natural waters in Japan. In Shiga Prefecture, wild-type carp have traditionally been called magoi (真鯉), in contrast to the cultivated type known as Yamato-goi.

Genetic studies have identified a native Japanese lineage that is strongly differentiated from Eurasian domesticated lineages. The traditional wild-type category and the genetically defined native lineage are related concepts but are not necessarily identical. The taxonomic status of the native lineage, and the scientific name that should be applied to it, remain unsettled.

Native Japanese mtDNA haplotypes have been detected in waters outside Lake Biwa, showing that the native lineage has not been restricted to Shiga Prefecture. However, relatively weakly introgressed native populations have been most clearly documented in the offshore deep-water zone of Lake Biwa, while hybridization with introduced Eurasian carp is widespread in Japanese natural waters. The Lake Biwa native population is listed by Japan's Ministry of the Environment as a Threatened Local Population (LP) on the Japanese national Red List.

== Background ==
Populations traditionally assigned to the common carp complex occur across the temperate regions of Eurasia, from East Asia to the Black Sea and Caspian Sea. Carp occurring in Japan were once generally considered to have been introduced from the Asian continent. Japanese researchers, however, had long suspected the presence of indigenous carp because pharyngeal teeth attributable to carp have been excavated from Jōmon period shell middens and from deposits of the ancient Lake Biwa system.

A 2005 analysis of mitochondrial DNA (mtDNA) from carp in Lake Biwa revealed individuals whose nucleotide sequences were strongly differentiated from those of Eurasian carp. The lineage was initially thought to be confined to Lake Biwa, but subsequent research detected the same or closely related native haplotypes in other Japanese waters.

== Native Japanese lineage ==
Mitochondrial DNA studies have demonstrated the existence of a Japanese native lineage that is genetically distinct from Eurasian carp populations. At the same time, Eurasian lineages introduced through aquaculture and stocking are now widely distributed in Japan, and hybridization between native and introduced lineages has occurred extensively.

Nuclear DNA markers have also been developed for distinguishing the Lake Biwa native lineage from introduced Eurasian carp. A 2012 study identified 21 single-nucleotide polymorphisms at seven loci that could be used to discriminate the two lineages and detect hybridization. A later study of 183 specimens using seven nuclear SNP markers also found genetic and morphological differences between typical native Japanese carp and introduced carp.

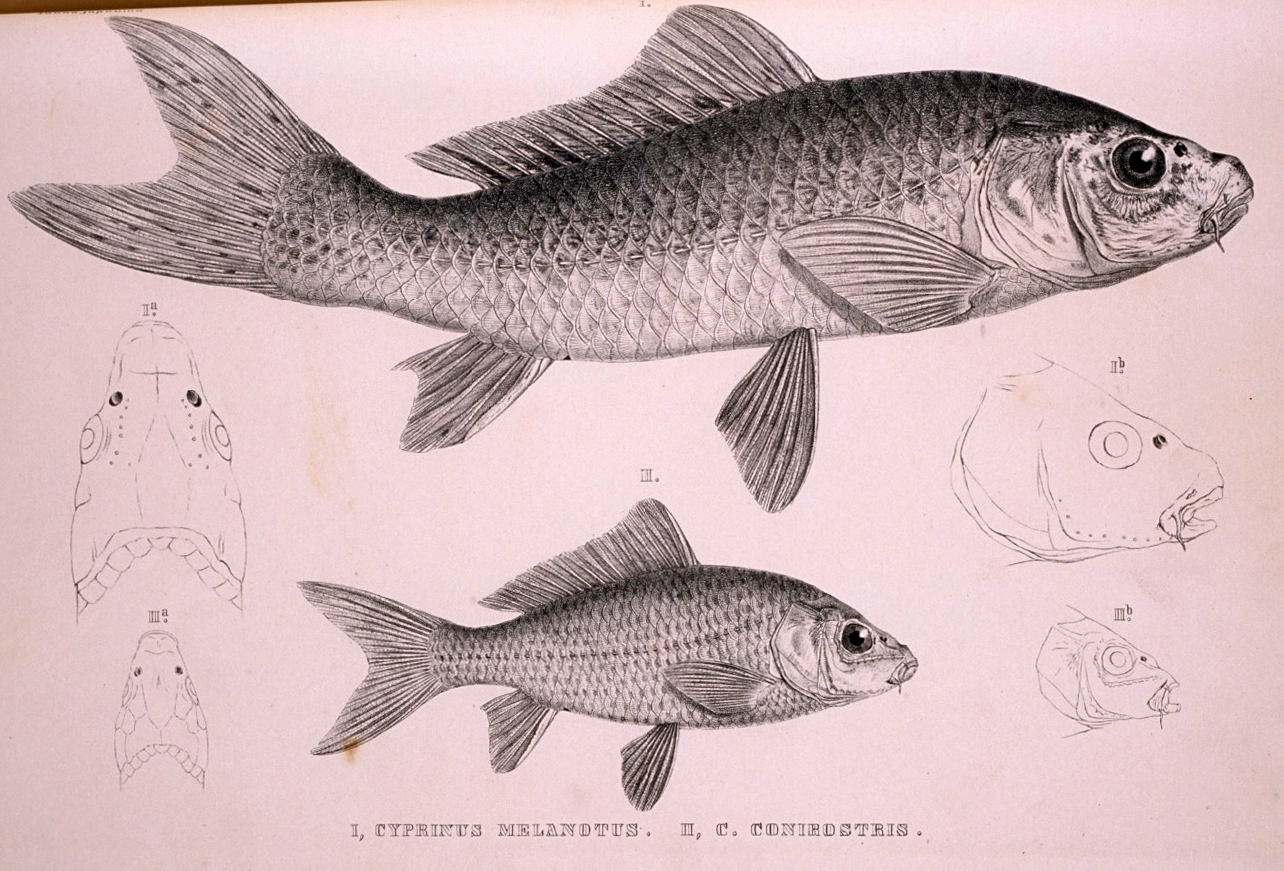
Cyprinus melanotus (upper) and C. conirostris (lower), illustrated in Fauna Japonica

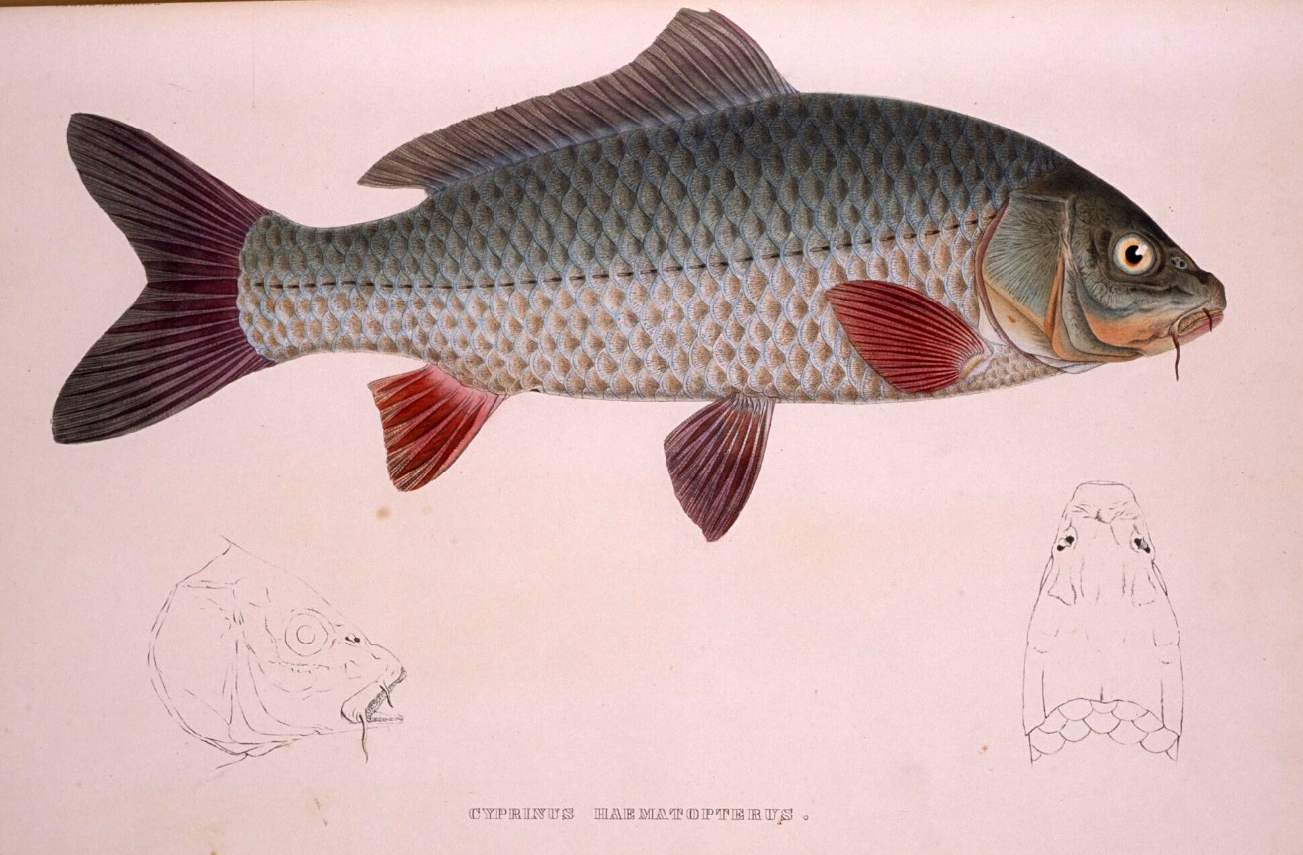
Cyprinus haematopterus, described from Japanese material in Fauna Japonica

The relationship between the native Japanese lineage and carp collected in Japan by Philipp Franz von Siebold has also been investigated. A research project led by Hiroshi Senou at the Kanagawa Prefectural Museum of Natural History compared type material held at the Naturalis Biodiversity Center. Its final grant report proposed that the name Cyprinus melanotus should be applied to the low-bodied native Japanese carp. The report also noted that specimens assigned to C. haematopterus and some paralectotypes of C. conirostris were comparatively deep-bodied, and suggested that carp derived from continental populations may already have been present in Japan by the Edo period.

In contrast, the current Eschmeyer's Catalog of Fishes treats C. melanotus as a synonym of the East Asian carp Cyprinus rubrofuscus. The application of a formal scientific name to the Japanese native lineage therefore remains unresolved.

== Distribution ==
A 2008 study examined mtDNA from carp at 11 localities in Japan and detected native Japanese haplotypes not only in Lake Biwa but also in other Japanese waters. Eurasian-derived haplotypes, however, were also widespread and occurred at high frequencies in many of the surveyed populations. The occurrence of native mtDNA outside Lake Biwa therefore does not by itself indicate the survival of genetically unintrogressed native populations.

Subsequent nuclear-DNA studies have shown extensive introgression with introduced Eurasian carp in Japanese natural waters. Relatively weakly introgressed native populations have been most clearly documented in the offshore deep-water zone of Lake Biwa, particularly at depths greater than 20 m. This distinction between the wider distribution of native haplotypes and the much more restricted survival of weakly introgressed populations accounts for the particular conservation importance of Lake Biwa.

== Morphology and ecology ==
Compared with cultivated carp, wild-type carp are generally more elongate and have a lower body depth.

Morphological comparison of wild-type and cultivated carp
Character	Wild type	Cultivated type
Body shape	Elongate and more cylindrical	Deeper-bodied
Head length	Shorter	Longer
Fin length	Shorter	Longer
Position of dorsal fin	More anterior	More posterior
Intestinal length	Shorter	Longer
Eye diameter	Larger	Smaller
Caudal peduncle	Slender and gradually tapered	Thicker and more abruptly tapered
Branched dorsal-fin rays	19–23	16–22
Lateral-line scales	35–39	33–39
Gill rakers	15–18	17–21

A study combining genetic assignment with morphological analysis likewise found that individuals with higher native ancestry tended to have more elongate bodies, more branched dorsal-fin rays, and fewer and shorter gill rakers. Native-type carp also tended to have a shorter intestine, a more developed pneumatic bulb, and a more coiled pneumatic duct.

The relatively short intestine of native-type carp has been interpreted as suggesting a stronger carnivorous feeding tendency. The more developed pneumatic structures have also been suggested to assist vertical movement between shallow and deep water by limiting gas loss from the swim bladder during rapid descent.

In Lake Biwa, wild-type carp are known to spend the winter offshore, move toward the shore to spawn in spring, and return offshore from autumn into winter.

The spawning season extends from April to August, broadly overlapping that of introduced carp, but native carp have been reported to spawn relatively frequently during the later part of the season, particularly in July and August.

Observations in culture ponds found that magoi were less likely than Yamato-goi to approach food immediately after feeding and were particularly reluctant to feed while people were nearby.

Wild-type carp have also been reported to show greater susceptibility to Koi herpesvirus than cultivated carp.

== Relationship with humans ==
Carp have long been harvested and cultivated in Japan. In Lake Biwa, magoi and Yamato-goi were distinguished by fishermen and commanded different market prices. Native and Eurasian-derived carp now coexist in many Japanese waters, where extensive hybridization has occurred.

The earliest secure record of the introduction of foreign carp to Japan is the importation of German carp, including mirror carp and leather carp, in 1905. A date of 1904 has also been proposed.

Carp introduced in 1890 from the residence of the shogunate official Kurimoto Jōun to Miyogaike Pond on Mikura-jima were later examined genetically. In a study of three individuals using mtDNA and seven nuclear loci, all three carried introduced mtDNA, while their nuclear DNA showed ancestry from both native and introduced lineages. The author noted, however, that the sample size and number of nuclear markers were limited and that confirmation using more individuals and markers was necessary.

=== Lake Biwa population ===
In Shiga Prefecture, wild-type carp have traditionally been called magoi and cultivated carp Yamato-goi. Intermediate forms were called kawasuji-goi. Fishermen distinguished magoi from Yamato-goi because the two also differed in market price. (Note: Most kawasuji-goi were treated commercially as magoi.)

Between May 1951 and March 1952, magoi accounted for approximately 80% of the carp landed at the principal fish markets around Lake Biwa, while Yamato-goi represented only a small proportion.

A major outbreak of Koi herpesvirus occurred in Lake Biwa in 2004, resulting in the recovery of large numbers of dead carp by July. Most examined carcasses were morphologically wild-type, and mtDNA analysis showed that most carried native Japanese haplotypes. Wild-type carp have been suggested to be more susceptible to koi herpesvirus than cultivated carp.

A survey of mtDNA in Lake Biwa found native haplotypes in an average of 88% of carp along the northern shore, compared with 48% on the eastern shore and 38% in the southern basin. The frequency of native haplotypes therefore declined from the northern basin toward the south.

Nuclear DNA analyses have shown that relatively weakly introgressed native carp remain particularly in the offshore deep-water zone of Lake Biwa, especially at depths greater than 20 m. In contrast, many carp in nearshore waters are hybrids, even though relatively few have the conspicuous external morphology of cultivated carp.

=== Yamato-goi ===
The cultivated carp traditionally called Yamato-goi in Shiga Prefecture originated as carp produced in Yamatokōriyama, Nara Prefecture. Goldfish culture had flourished there since the Edo-period Kōriyama Domain, and carp were also raised and became known as Yamato-goi.

The Ōmi Fisheries Association purchased juvenile carp from what was then Kōriyama Town and released a total of 744,000 into Lake Biwa from 1891 through 1894. After an interruption, the Shiga Prefectural Fisheries Experimental Station released another 4,127,752 juveniles between 1901 and 1908. The total number released exceeded 4.8 million. By the end of the Meiji period, contemporary accounts reported a decline in the proportion of wild-type carp in the catch and an increase in Yamato-goi. Yamato-goi were subsequently purchased by fisheries stations in other prefectures and stocked widely throughout Japan.

In Kōriyama Domain, samurai households are said to have begun raising carp and goldfish in household ponds as a supplementary occupation around the Tenpō era (1830–1844). It remains unclear when and by what route the deep-bodied cultivated form became established in Yamatokōriyama.

=== Shinshū carp ===
Alongside Yamato-goi, carp raised in Shinano Province, especially the Saku carp, were well known as cultivated carp from the Edo period onward. Shinshū carp were also referred to as Yodo carp in some sources.

Two traditions concerning their origin have been recorded. According to one, Usuda Tan'emon of the former Sakurai Village visited Osaka, admired the taste of Yodo carp and brought them home. According to another, Naitō Masatsuna, lord of Iwamurada Domain, presented Yodo carp as a "rare fish" in 1825 to the wealthy farmer Namiki Shichizaemon of the former Nozawa Village in gratitude for financial assistance to the domain.

An article published in Nōgyō Zasshi in 1900 described Shinshū carp as "generally short-bodied and broad". German carp were introduced into Nagano Prefecture from the Imperial Fisheries Institute in 1906 for crossing experiments with Saku carp, but the description of the characteristic body shape of Shinshū carp predates that introduction.

== Conservation ==
The native carp population of Lake Biwa is listed by Japan's Ministry of the Environment as a Threatened Local Population (LP) on the national Red List and as a rare taxon in the Shiga Prefecture Red Data Book. The LP designation is a category of the Japanese national system rather than an IUCN Red List category.

Hybridization with introduced carp is widespread in Japanese natural waters and represents a major threat to the genetic integrity of the native lineage. In Lake Biwa, comparatively weakly introgressed native carp survive in offshore deep water, whereas hybridization is widespread in nearshore habitats.
