= Ranid herpesvirus 1 =

Virus classification
- (unranked): Virus
- Realm: Duplodnaviria
- Kingdom: Heunggongvirae
- Phylum: Peploviricota
- Class: Herviviricetes
- Order: Herpesvirales
- Family: Alloherpesviridae
- Genus: Batravirus
- Species: Batravirus ranidallo1

Synonyms
- Lucké tumor herpesvirus; LTHV; Ranid herpesvirus 1; RaHV-1

Species of virus

Ranid herpesvirus 1 (RaHV-1), is a double-stranded DNA virus within the order Herpesvirales. The virus was initially observed within renal tumors in 1934 by Baldwin Lucké, and more recently has become identifiable through the use of PCR in samples isolated from frog tumors. RaHV-1 causes renal tumors within the northern leopard frog, Rana pipiens. The virus has not yet been isolated in vitro within cell lines, meaning that while its existence and symptoms are fairly evident, its methods of transmission, cell infection, and reproduction are largely unknown.

Since it has not been cultured in vitro, temporal studies regarding the kinetics of virus growth and biological and molecular events in the replication cycle have not been undergone extensively. Ranid herpesvirus 1, along with Ranid herpesvirus 2 and 3, are the only herpes viruses known to infect amphibians.

== Structure ==
With its lipid envelope, the virus is approximately 170 nm in diameter. The capsid itself has been measured to be approximately 90-110 nm in diameter and expresses T=16 icosahedral symmetry. The complete virion includes a capsid with triangular facets. The facets contain five shared capsomeres per edge. The facet edges enclose three central capsomeres. The entire capsid contains 162 capsomeres.

Other viruses within the family Alloherpesviridae have been shown to have spherical lipid envelopes with capsids expressing T=16 icosahedral symmetry, fitting with these measurements.

== Genome ==
Ranid herpesvirus 1 is a double-stranded DNA virus approximately 217kbp in size. The genome is highly linear in structure and has a GC content of 45-47%. RaHV-1 and similar amphibian herpesviruses have been placed in the family Alloherpesviridae instead of being associated with mammalian herpesviruses. This is due to the fact that it shares many of its genomic and pathogenic characteristics with Ictalurid herpesvirus 1, another virus within the family Alloherpesviridae.

== Replication cycle ==
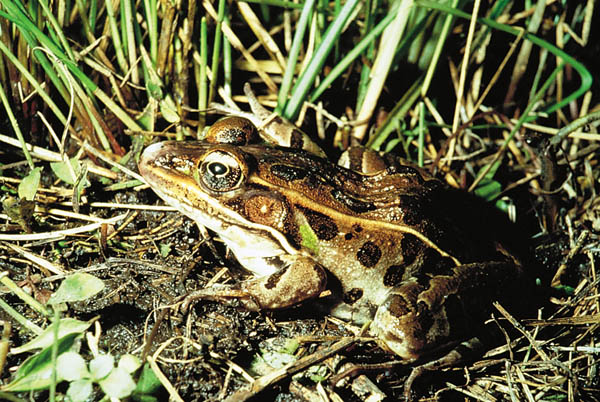
A healthy northern leopard frog (Rana pipiens) in its habitat

During the cooler winter months, the virus replicates rapidly without the host exhibiting many symptoms. Once the warmer months roll around, viral replication rates dramatically lower to the point of little to no replication, and tumor growth begins. This is not due to the lack of an immune response in the frogs during hibernation, but the temperature of the months themselves. This is illustrated by the fact that tumors can be cleansed of the virus by exposing them to high temperatures, even in the absence of antibodies. This is also seen in the studies in which warm frogs nearly devoid of tumors are cooled down, reinitiating viral replication.

Mature tumors are often devoid of virus particles, while younger tumors in the warm weather still usually contain viral particles.

=== Entry into the cell ===
Ranid herpesvirus 1 has not yet been isolated within cell lines, despite multiple efforts utilizing various cells from amphibian, mammalian, and piscine species. The only case of successful transfections of an organism with the virus has been seen following the injection of the virus into tadpoles. These injections cause the host, once matured, to begin exhibiting renal adenocarcinoma. This has led to the theory that the virus is transmitted by the infection of oocytes in tumor-bearing female frogs.

While not much is known specifically on the entry of RaHV-1 into host cells, the family to which the virus belongs, Alloherpesviridae, has been shown to have particular mechanisms of entry and replication. Glycoprotein complexes embedded within the viral envelope of these viruses attach to receptors within the host cell's membrane. These activated receptors then mediate endocytosis of the virus into the cell. Whether the virus enters specifically through endocytosis or membrane fusion is still not known in all cases; it is believed to vary depending on the host cell type.

=== Replication and release of virus and viral genome ===
Since this specific virus has never been cultured in vitro, the exact replication cycle has not been specifically identified. However, other viruses in the Alloherpesviridae family undergo genomic replication by utilizing the host cell's nucleus, eventually leading to lysis. The steps to this method of replication (excluding the aforementioned process of cell entry) are as follow:

This is a simplified diagram of the herpes simplex virus. A notable difference is that Alloherpesviridae viruses are not shown to go to the endoplasmic reticulum after assembly, but instead, head to the golgi apparatus before being released from the cell. Except for this difference, viruses within Alloherpesviridae have a very similar replication scheme.

1. The capsid is transported to the cell's nucleus.
2. Viral DNA enters the host's nucleus via nuclear pores.
3. Early genes within the viral DNA are transcribed by the host, allowing for the priming of further transcription of viral DNA.
4. The early viral genes are then transcribed by host polymerase II.
5. The newly formed early viral mRNA is then transported out of the nucleus into the cytoplasm.
6. The early viral mRNA is translated into early proteins.
7. These early proteins are transported into the nucleus, where they are involved in the replication of viral DNA.
8. Viral DNA-dependent DNA polymerase synthesizes multiple copies of viral DNA.
9. The late viral genes are then transcribed by host polymerase II.
10. The newly formed late viral mRNA is translated into late proteins, which are involved in the formation and structure of the capsid.
11. These late proteins are transported back into the nucleus.
12. The virus is then assembled in the nucleus, which at this point has been modified such as to become a factory for viral DNA.
13. Herpes glycoproteins modify the nucleus, allowing the budding of the newly formed virus through the inner lamella of the nuclear membrane to begin.
14. The virus is transported to the Golgi apparatus and subsequently released from the cell's membrane

== Interactions with and modifications of host ==
The effects infection has within Rana pipiens by Ranid herpesvirus 1 are most apparent in the renal system and adjacent fatty areas. Fluid begins to build up in the abdomen of the infected organism, causing large ascites. Once the viral genome is incorporated into the kidney cells, cellular replication and/or death is modified in a way such that tumors begin to form rapidly in this region. Once these tumors begin to metastasize, however, it is possible for the formation of tumors to spread throughout the body of the organism instead of staying in one specific region.

== Tropism ==
The virus appears to have specificity for renal tissues within the species Rana pipiens. It is possible that this is because the glycoproteins embedded within the viral envelope attach to and are selective to the membrane proteins found on their renal tissues. Once tumors have grown though, the tumors can metastasize to other areas of the body. This raises the question of whether the virus has some way of spreading to the rest of the body, although a lack of evidence seems to point away from this conclusion.

== Associated diseases and pathology ==
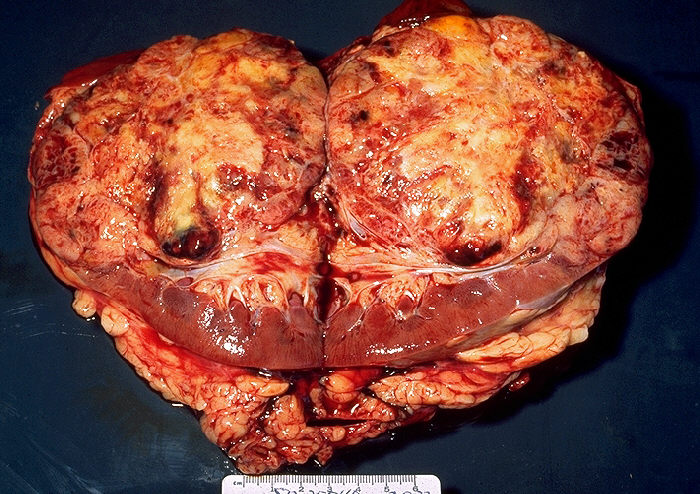
A bisected human kidney exhibiting multiple renal adenocarcinomas

Ranid herpesvirus 1 causes renal adenocarcinomas in northern leopard frogs, Rana pipiens. The resulting tumors, generally large and papillary in nature, are referred to as Lucké tumors. Due to the strong link between viral replication rate and temperature, tumor growth is most rapid in the warmer summer months. Growth slows during the winter, although eosinophilic intranuclear inclusions may still be found within wintering frogs that have been infected with the virus. The following summer, tumor growth reinitiates. These tumors can metastasize and result in tumors located elsewhere in the organism. The virus can be found in the primary tumor and metastatic cells of the bladder, fat body, and liver of the organism. On average, there is approximately 5 X 10^{11} virus particles per gram of algid tumor. Tumor growth can be identified through the use of light and electron microscopy.

Lethargy, ascites, emaciation, and death are the most common visible symptoms of a diseased organism, although diseased frogs may not show significant signs of being infected until the disease has advanced to later stages. The ascitic fluid of the organism can also contain neoplastic cells that may or may not be malignant and cancerous. The disease kills many of the infected following replication that year. When examined posthumously, the tumors on these frogs are commonly seen to be white in color. There is no known treatment for this virus, and the best way to control it is to allow the frogs to die off without reproducing and spreading the disease to other frogs.
