= Koi herpesvirus =

Virus classification
- (unranked): Virus
- Realm: Duplodnaviria
- Kingdom: Heunggongvirae
- Phylum: Peploviricota
- Class: Herviviricetes
- Order: Herpesvirales
- Family: Alloherpesviridae
- Genus: Cyvirus
- Species: Cyvirus cyprinidallo3

Synonyms
- Cyprinid herpesvirus 3; CyHV-3; Koi herpesvirus; KHV

Species of virus

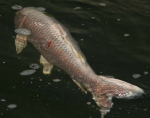
A platinum Ogon koi, with skin reddening due to Koi herpesvirus infection

Koi herpesvirus (KHV) is a species in the genus Cyvirus, the family Alloherpesviridae, and the order Herpesvirales. It causes a viral disease that is very contagious to the common carp Cyprinus carpio.

== Pathology ==
It is most commonly found in ornamental koi, which are often used in outdoor ponds or as feeder stock. The first case of KHV was reported in 1998, but not confirmed until later in 1999.

KHV is a DNA-based virus. After discovery, it was identified as a strain of herpesvirus. Like other strains, KHV stays with the infected fish for the duration of their lives, making the recovered and exposed fish potential carriers of the virus. Koi fish infected with KHV may die within the first 24–48 hours of exposure. The virus is found in 33 countries.

KHV is listed as a nonexotic disease of the EU, so is watched closely by the European Community Reference Laboratory for Fish Diseases.

Symptoms of KHV include:

- Gill mottling
- Red and white patches appearing on gills
- Bleeding gills
- Sunken eyes
- Pale patches
- Blisters

Changes in the specimen's behaviour may also indicate the presence of KHV. Behavioural symptoms may include disorientation, hyperactivity, and potentially isolation, in which the specimen detaches themselves from the shoal.

== Use as a biological control agent ==
In 2016, the Australian government announced plans to release the virus into the Murray-Darling basin in an attempt to reduce the number of invasive common carp in the water system. In 2020, though, this plan was found to be unlikely to work.
