= Ictavirus =

Virus classification
- (unranked): Virus
- Realm: Duplodnaviria
- Kingdom: Heunggongvirae
- Phylum: Peploviricota
- Class: Herviviricetes
- Order: Herpesvirales
- Family: Alloherpesviridae
- Genus: Ictavirus

Species
- See text

Genus of viruses

Ictavirus, formerly called Ictalurivirus, is a genus of viruses in the order Herpesvirales, in the family Alloherpesviridae. Fish serve as natural hosts. There are three species in this genus. Diseases associated with this genus include: channel catfish disease.

== Species ==
The genus consists of the following species, listed by scientific name and followed by common name:

- Ictavirus acipenseridallo2, Acipenserid herpesvirus 2
- Ictavirus ictaluridallo1, Channel catfish virus
- Ictavirus ictaluridallo2, Ictalurid herpesvirus 2

== Structure ==
Viruses in Ictavirus are enveloped, with icosahedral and spherical to pleomorphic geometries, and T=16 symmetry. The diameter is around 150-200 nm. Genomes are linear and non-segmented, around 134kb in length.

Genus	Structure	Symmetry	Capsid	Genomic arrangement	Genomic segmentation
Ictavirus	Spherical pleomorphic	T=16	Enveloped	Circular	Monopartite

== Life cycle ==
Viral replication is nuclear, and is lysogenic. Entry into the host cell is achieved by attachment of the viral glycoproteins to host receptors, which mediates endocytosis. DNA templated transcription is the method of transcription. Fish serve as the natural host. Transmission routes are passive diffusion.

Genus	Host details	Tissue tropism	Entry details	Release details	Replication site	Assembly site	Transmission
Ictavirus	Fish	None	Glycoprotiens	Budding	Nucleus	Nucleus	Passive diffusion
