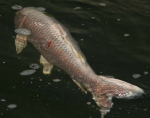

Virus classification
- (unranked): Virus
- Realm: Duplodnaviria
- Kingdom: Heunggongvirae
- Phylum: Peploviricota
- Class: Herviviricetes
- Order: Herpesvirales
- Family: Alloherpesviridae
- Genus: Cyvirus

Species
- See text

Synonyms
- Cyprinivirus

= Cyvirus =

Genus of viruses

Cyvirus, previously named Cyprinivirus, is a genus of viruses in the order Herpesvirales, in the family Alloherpesviridae. Freshwater eels serve as natural hosts. There are four species in this genus. Diseases associated with this genus include: hemorrhagic disease.

== Species ==
The genus consists of the following species, listed by scientific name and followed by common name:

- Cyvirus anguillidallo1, Anguillid herpesvirus 1
- Cyvirus cyprinidallo1, Cyprinid herpesvirus 1
- Cyvirus cyprinidallo2, Cyprinid herpesvirus 2
- Cyvirus cyprinidallo3, Koi herpesvirus

== Structure ==
Viruses in Cyvirus are enveloped, with icosahedral and spherical to pleomorphic geometries, and T=16 symmetry. The diameter is around 200 nm. Genomes are linear and non-segmented, around 10kb in length. The genome codes for 136 proteins.

Genus	Structure	Symmetry	Capsid	Genomic arrangement	Genomic segmentation
Cyvirus	Spherical pleomorphic	T=16	Enveloped	Linear	Monopartite

== Life cycle ==
Viral replication is nuclear, and is lysogenic. Entry into the host cell is achieved by attachment of the viral glycoproteins to host receptors, which mediates endocytosis. DNA-templated transcription is the method of transcription. Freshwater eel serve as the natural host. Transmission routes are passive diffusion.

Genus	Host details	Tissue tropism	Entry details	Release details	Replication site	Assembly site	Transmission
Cyvirus	Fresh water eel	None	Glycoprotiens	Budding	Cytoplasm	Cytoplasm	Passive diffusion
