= Salmovirus =

Virus classification
- (unranked): Virus
- Realm: Duplodnaviria
- Kingdom: Heunggongvirae
- Phylum: Peploviricota
- Class: Herviviricetes
- Order: Herpesvirales
- Family: Alloherpesviridae
- Genus: Salmovirus

Species
- See text

Genus of viruses

Salmovirus, previously called Salmonivirus, is a genus of viruses in the order Herpesvirales, in the family Alloherpesviridae. Salmonidae serve as natural hosts. There are three species in this genus. Diseases associated with this genus include: SalHV-3: epizootic epitheliotropic disease.

== Species ==
The genus consists of the following species, listed by scientific name and followed by common name:

- Salmovirus salmonidallo1, Salmonid herpesvirus 1
- Salmovirus salmonidallo2, Oncorhynchus masou virus
- Salmovirus salmonidallo3, Epizootic epitheliotropic disease virus

== Structure ==
Viruses in Salmovirus are enveloped, with icosahedral and spherical to pleomorphic geometries, and T=16 symmetry. The diameter is around 150-200 nm. Genomes are linear and non-segmented.

| Genus | Structure | Symmetry | Capsid | Genomic arrangement | Genomic segmentation |
|---|---|---|---|---|---|
| Salmovirus | Spherical pleomorphic | T=16 | Enveloped | Linear | Monopartite |

== Life cycle ==
Viral replication is nuclear, and is lysogenic. Entry into the host cell is achieved by attachment of the viral glycoproteins to host receptors, which mediates endocytosis. DNA-templated transcription is the method of transcription. Salmonidae serve as the natural host. Transmission routes are passive diffusion.

| Genus | Host details | Tissue tropism | Entry details | Release details | Replication site | Assembly site | Transmission |
|---|---|---|---|---|---|---|---|
| Salmovirus | Salmonidae | None | Glycoprotiens | Budding | Nucleus | Nucleus | Passive diffusion |
