= Batravirus =

Virus classification
- (unranked): Virus
- Realm: Duplodnaviria
- Kingdom: Heunggongvirae
- Phylum: Peploviricota
- Class: Herviviricetes
- Order: Herpesvirales
- Family: Alloherpesviridae
- Genus: Batravirus

Species
- See text

Genus of viruses

Batravirus is a genus of viruses in the order Herpesvirales, in the family Alloherpesviridae. Frogs serve as natural hosts. There are three species in this genus. Diseases associated with this genus include: raHV-1: Lucké tumor (renal adenocarcinoma).

== Species ==
The genus consists of the following species, listed by scientific name and followed by common name:

- Batravirus ranidallo1, Ranid herpesvirus 1
- Batravirus ranidallo2, Ranid herpesvirus 2
- Batravirus ranidallo3, Ranid herpesvirus 3

== Structure ==
Viruses in Batravirus are enveloped, with icosahedral and spherical to pleomorphic geometries, and T=16 symmetry. The diameter is around 150-200 nm. Genomes are linear and non-segmented, around 220-231kb in length.

Genus	Structure	Symmetry	Capsid	Genomic arrangement	Genomic segmentation
Batravirus	Spherical pleomorphic	T=16	Enveloped	Linear	Monopartite

== Life cycle ==
Viral replication is nuclear, and is lysogenic. Entry into the host cell is achieved by attachment of the viral glycoproteins to host receptors, which mediates endocytosis. DNA-templated transcription is the method of transcription. Frogs serve as the natural host. Transmission routes are passive diffusion.

Genus	Host details	Tissue tropism	Entry details	Release details	Replication site	Assembly site	Transmission
Batravirus	Frogs	None	Glycoprotiens	Budding	Cytoplasm	Cytoplasm	Passive diffusion
