= Miniature Inverted-repeat Transposable Elements =

Miniature Inverted-repeat Transposable Elements (MITEs) are a group of non-autonomous Class II transposable elements (DNA sequences). Being non-autonomous, MITEs cannot code for their own transposase. They exist within the genomes of animals, plants, fungi, bacteria and even viruses. MITEs are generally short (50 to 500 bp) elements with terminal inverted repeats (TIRs; 10–15 bp) and two flanking target site duplications (TSDs). Like other transposons, MITEs are inserted predominantly in gene-rich regions and this can be a reason that they affect gene expression and play important roles in accelerating eukaryotic evolution. Their high copy number in spite of small sizes has been a topic of interest.

== Origin of MITEs ==
A detailed study of MITEs reveals that MITE subfamilies have arisen from related autonomous elements from a single genome and these subfamilies constitute the MITE families. One type of autonomous element can give rise to one or more MITE families.

== Classification ==
Based on their relations in sequences of TIRs with known TE superfamilies, MITEs have been classified into certain families. For example, wTourist, Acrobat, Hearthealer are MITE families in some plant species are under the TE superfamily PIF/Harbinger. Stowaway is a MITE family in Pisum sativum L. with TSD TA in relation to Tc1/mariner TE superfamily. A group of MITEs known as CMITES related to Piggybac superfamily were found in certain coral species.

While most of the MITEs are grouped, some of them are yet to be allotted their TE superfamilies. Such families include AtATE in Arabidopsis thaliana and ATon family found in Aedes aegypti. Besides this, many more MITE families are likely to be discovered.

== MITEs in Plant Genomes ==
MITEs were first discovered in plants. Elements belonging to the CACTA, hAT, Mutator, PIF, and Tc1/Mariner superfamilies have been described. Depending upon the similarity of their terminal inverted repeats and target site duplications, most of the MITEs in plant genomes are divided into two major groups: Tourist-like MITEs (derived from PIF) and Stowaway-like MITEs (derived from Tc1/mariner).Stowaway and Tourist elements differ remarkably in their sequences. Still, they have been found to have significant structural similarities.

Stowaway elements possess target site specificity, have small size and conserved terminal inverted repeat. So is the case determined in Tourist like MITEs. They can form stable DNA secondary structures which can be very useful in identifying them. A few Stowaway elements also contain cis-acting regulatory domains.

Other MITE superfamilies have also been described in plants, such as hAT-type MITEs in banana and the nightshades.

== MITEs as Genetic Markers ==
Based on the presence or absence of MITE family Heartbreaker (Hbr) in maize genome, a molecular marker was developed. These Hbr markers have been proved to be stable, uniformly distributed in maize genome. A study by Casa et al. showed that HBr markers could be used along with other molecular markers to study genotype of related maize inbred lines.

== Computational Assistance ==
Software like FINDMITE use sequence entries of some average sized bp to identify MITE families. A MATLAB-based program called detectMITE can detect MITEs on a genome wide scale and was tested on the rice genome. Other tools like MUST and MITE-Hunter are also used for similar purposes. To characterize MITE families a toolkit has been developed called MITE Analysis Kit MAK by Yang and Hall.
