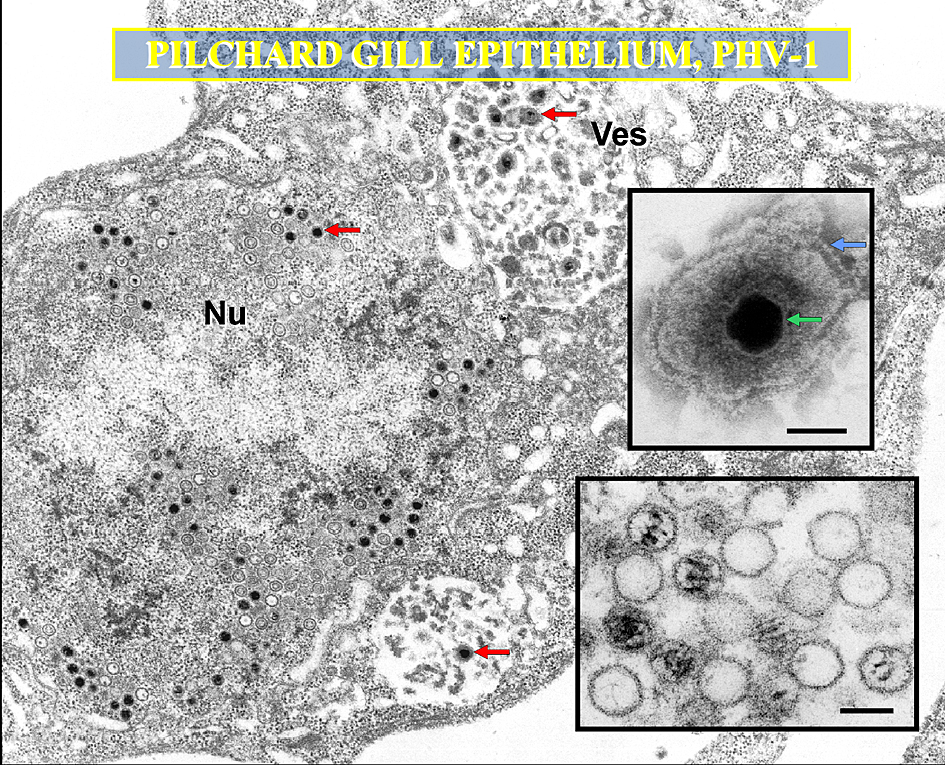
- TEM micrograph on an alloherpesvirus, 'Pilchard herpesvirus'

Virus classification
- (unranked): Virus
- Realm: Duplodnaviria
- Kingdom: Heunggongvirae
- Phylum: Peploviricota
- Class: Herviviricetes
- Order: Herpesvirales
- Family: Alloherpesviridae

Genera
- See text

= Alloherpesviridae =

Family of viruses

Alloherpesviridae is a family of viruses in the order Herpesvirales. This family includes the species that infect fish and amphibians. Phylogenetic studies have confirmed the validity of this family and suggest that it may be divided into two clades: one consisting of viruses from cyprinid and anguillid hosts and the other of viruses from ictalurid, salmonid, acipenserid, and ranid hosts. The family has four genera. A disease associated with this family is channel catfish disease.

== Taxonomy ==
Alloherpesviridae was established as a family in 2005.

=== Genera ===
The family contains the following four genera:

- Batravirus
- Cyvirus
- Ictavirus
- Salmovirus

== Structure ==
Viruses in Alloherpesviridae are enveloped, with icosahedral and spherical to pleomorphic geometries, and T=16 symmetry. The diameter is around 150–200 nm. Genomes are linear and non-segmented, around 134-248kb in length.

Genus	Structure	Symmetry	Capsid	Genomic arrangement	Genomic segmentation
Ictavirus	Spherical pleomorphic	T=16	Enveloped	Circular	Monopartite
Cyvirus	Spherical pleomorphic	T=16	Enveloped	Linear	Monopartite
Batravirus	Spherical pleomorphic	T=16	Enveloped	Linear	Monopartite
Salmovirus	Spherical pleomorphic	T=16	Enveloped	Linear	Monopartite

== Life cycle ==
Viral replication is nuclear, and is lysogenic. Entry into the host cell is achieved by attachment of the viral glycoproteins to host receptors, which mediates endocytosis. DNA-templated transcription is the method of transcription. Fish serve as the natural host. Transmission routes are passive diffusion.

Genus	Host details	Tissue tropism	Entry details	Release details	Replication site	Assembly site	Transmission
Ictavirus	Fish	None	Glycoprotiens	Budding	Nucleus	Nucleus	Passive diffusion
Cyvirus	Fresh water eel	None	Glycoprotiens	Budding	Cytoplasm	Cytoplasm	Passive diffusion
Batravirus	Frogs	None	Glycoprotiens	Budding	Cytoplasm	Cytoplasm	Passive diffusion
Salmovirus	Salmonidae	None	Glycoprotiens	Budding	Nucleus	Nucleus	Passive diffusion

== Genomics ==
Several genomes have been sequenced. Cyprinid herpesviruses 1, 2 and 3 (CyHV1, CyHV2 and CyHV3) cause disease in common carp, goldfish and koi. Their genomes are 291144, 290304 and 295146 base pairs in size. The overall organisation common to all three and consists of a unique central region flanked by a direct repeat at each end. 137, 150, and 155 unique, functional protein coding genes are present in the unique regions: of these six, four, and eight are duplicated in the terminal repeat. The genomes share 120 orthologous genes in a largely colinear arrangement. Up to 55 of these latter genes are also conserved in the other members of Cyvirus; Anguillid herpesvirus 1. CyHV1, CyHV2, and CyHV3 have five, six and five families of paralogous genes.
